= Nuclear triad =

Set of three types of nuclear-strike standoff weapons

A nuclear triad is a three-pronged military force structure of global-range land-based intercontinental ballistic missiles (ICBMs), submarine-launched ballistic missiles (SLBMs), and strategic bombers with nuclear bombs and missiles. More broadly, it can sometimes be used to mean any nuclear force with land, sea, and air basing, and more limited range. Countries build nuclear triads to eliminate an enemy's ability to destroy a nation's nuclear forces in a first-strike attack, which preserves their own ability to launch a second strike and therefore increases their nuclear deterrence.

Four countries are known to have a nuclear triad: the United States, Russia, India, and China. The US and the USSR (the predecessor state to Russia) acquired triads as part of the Cold War's nuclear arms race, operationalizing SLBMs during the 1960s. Meanwhile, India achieved one in 2018, and China did so in 2020.

France had a nuclear triad, but in 1996 France abandoned its strategic bombers, IRBM underground silo-based S3 missiles, and Hadès SRBMs. Despite becoming the third nuclear power in 1952, the United Kingdom has never operated a triad.

Israel likely possesses weapons in a triad structure, but lacks true strategic range in all three 'legs.'

== Components of a strategic nuclear triad ==
The components of the nuclear triad

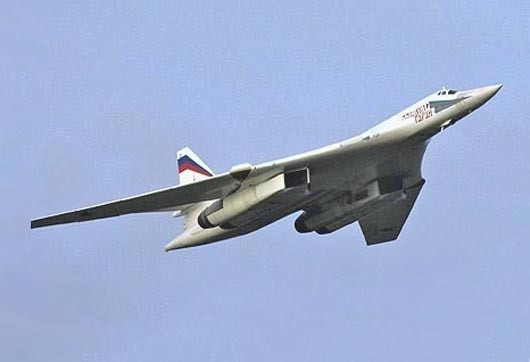
Bomber aircraft

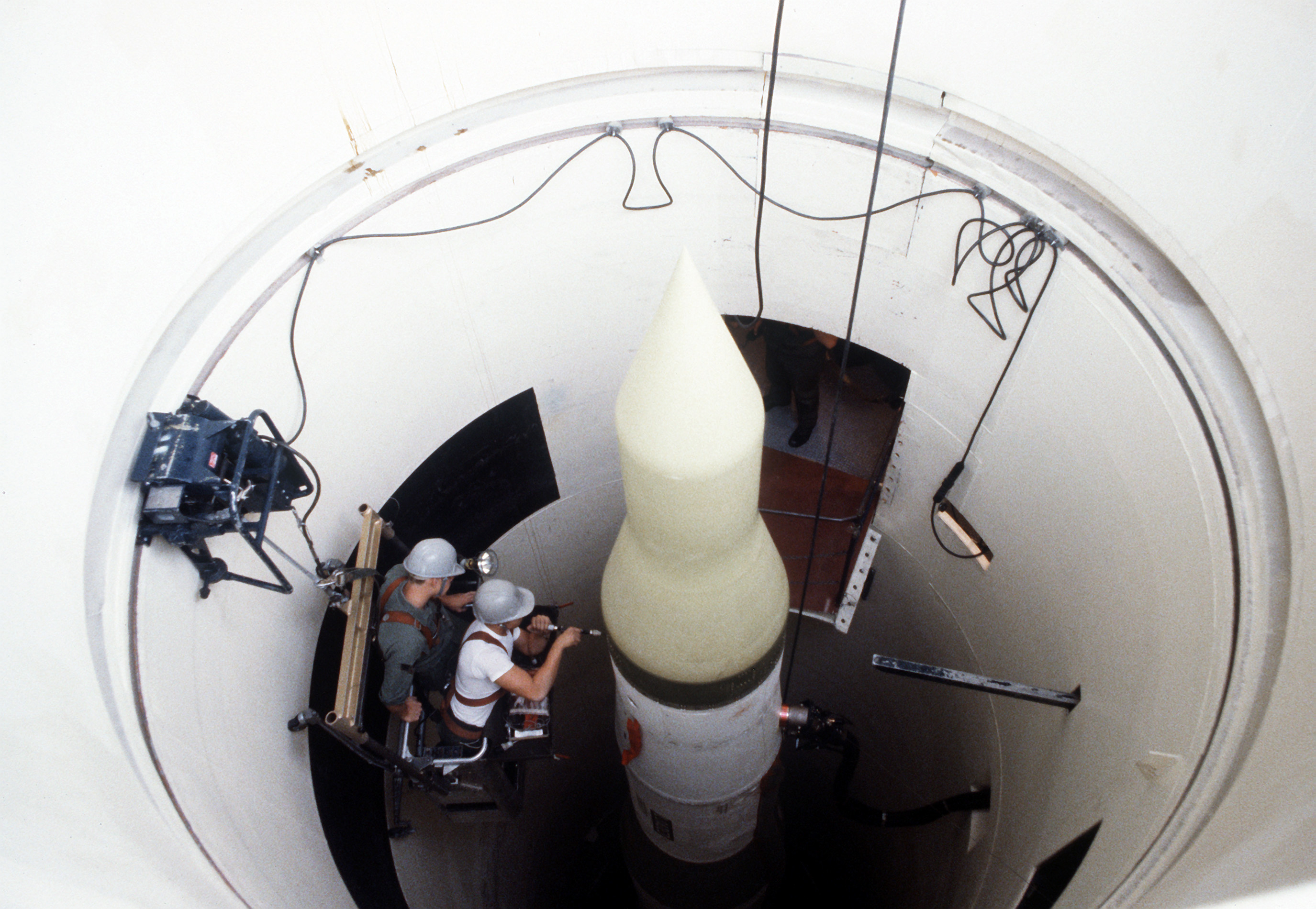
Intercontinental ballistic missile

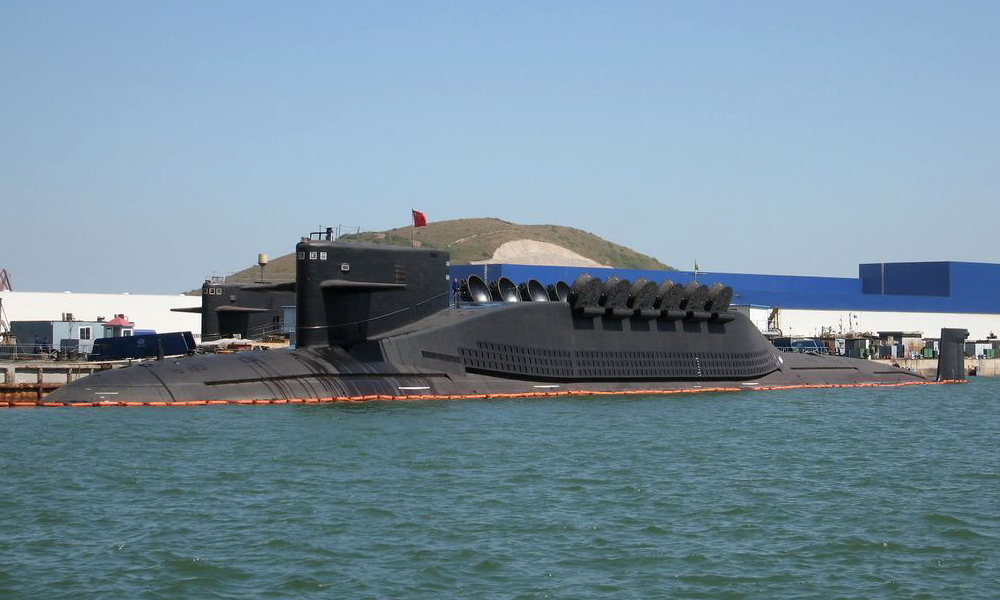
Ballistic missile submarine

While traditional nuclear strategy holds that a nuclear triad provides the best level of deterrence from attack, most nuclear powers do not have the military budget to sustain a full triad. The only two countries that have successfully maintained a strong nuclear triad for most of the nuclear age are the United States and Russia. Triads include:

1. Bomber aircraft: Aircraft carrying nuclear weapons including gravity bombs, or air-launched ballistic or cruise missiles (ALBMs or ALCMs), for use against ground or sea targets.
2. Land-based missiles of various ranges (GLCMs, SRBMs, MRBMs, IRBMs or ICBMs): Delivery vehicles powered by a liquid or solid-fueled rocket that primarily travel in a ballistic (free-fall) trajectory.
3. Ballistic missile submarines (SSBNs): Nuclear missiles launched from ships or submarines (SLBMs, SLCMs). They are classified under an umbrella of vessels and submarines that are capable of launching a ballistic missile.

The triad enables a nation to deliver a nuclear attack by air, land, or sea. The United States built its triad to maximize the probability that it could retaliate for a first strike. Having three legs also protects against new technology, like an enemy missile-defense system. It also gives the commander-in-chief the flexibility to use different types of weapons for the appropriate strike while also maintaining a reserve of nuclear weapons safe from a counter-force strike.

- Strategic bombers are the first leg of the triad. They have greater flexibility in their deployment and weaponry, and can be quickly deployed and recalled in response to last-minute decisions. Since bombers are recallable, sending them away from a potential target is a highly visible way of demonstrating to enemies and allies that a nation wants to resolve a fight, thus preventing war. Some disadvantages include confusion on the type of payload. Bombers can hold both nuclear and conventional weapons. During an event, an enemy could suspect that a conventionally-armed bomber was actually carrying a nuclear weapon, encouraging the enemy to attack the bomber or make a nuclear strike. Furthermore, bombers that are scrambled might intensify tension and arouse suspicion of an upcoming nuclear strike. Bombers can serve as both a first- and second-strike weapon. For example, a bomber armed with AGM-129 ACM missiles could be classified as a first-strike weapon and bombers that are classified as needing an aerial refueling aircraft to strike targets would constitute as a second-strike weapon. If dispersed in small airfields or aboard an aircraft carrier, they can reasonably avoid a counterstrike giving them regional second-strike capacity. Aircraft such as the Mirage 2000, F-15E, A-5 Vigilante, Sea Harrier, or FB-111 were tasked with land or sea-based strategic nuclear attack missions. Bombers that contain an aerial refueling fleet support intercontinental strategic operations for both heavy bombers and smaller aircraft. It also makes it possible for bombers to be alert and on standby, making these airborne assets nearly impossible to eliminate in a first strike. Strategic bombers generally fall into two categories:
  - Stealth or supersonic bombers capable of delivering nuclear gravity bombs with low risk of interception. Operational examples are the US stealth B-2 Spirit and Russian supersonic Tu-160. Future examples are the US stealth B-21 Raider, Chinese stealth H-20, and Russian stealth PAK DA.
  - Bombers which carry long-range nuclear weapons, typically air-launched cruise missiles, and more rarely air-launched ballistic missile. Operational examples include the US B-52 Stratofortress and Russian Tu-95MS.
- Intercontinental ballistic missiles (ICBMs) allow for a long-range strike launched from a controlled environment. These missiles can also be launched, and reach targets, faster than the other legs of the triad. Because firing an ICBM is an unmistakable act, they provide stronger clarity about when a country is under attack and who the attacker is. ICBMs launched from fixed positions, like missile silos, are vulnerable to a first strike, though their interception once aloft is substantially difficult. This vulnerability, along with their general inability to be forward-deployed, weakens ICBMs' contribution to nuclear deterrence compared to bombers or submarines. Some ICBMs are mobile by either rail or road. Medium-range ballistic missiles and ground-launched cruise missiles were assigned to strategic targets but bilaterally forbidden by the United States and Russia from 1987 to 2019.
- Submarine-launched ballistic missiles (SLBMs) maintain a greater chance of surviving a first strike, giving the commander a second-strike capability. Nuclear submarines do not have fixed locations like missile silos or airfields, and they are more easily concealed than bombers. Because of their low detectability and quick mobility, SLBMs are almost invulnerable at sea. A disadvantage of SLBMs is that it might be unclear whether the destruction of a nuclear submarine was the result of an accident or an attack. Also, maintaining a force of nuclear submarines can be very expensive.

Tactical nuclear weapons, also known as non-strategic nuclear weapons, are used in air, land and sea warfare. Their primary use in a non-strategic war-fighting role is to destroy military forces in the battle area. But, depending on the target in today's nuclear age, they are not counted toward triad status because of the possibility that many of these systems could be used as strategic weapons. During the Cold War, it was easy to point out which nuclear weapons were tactical. Each type of weapon had different capabilities that were better suited for different missions. Air-to-air missiles, rockets, surface-to-air missiles, small air-to-ground rockets, bombs, and precision munitions have been developed and deployed with nuclear warheads. Ground forces have included tactical nuclear artillery shells, surface-to-surface rockets, land mines, medium and small man-packable nuclear engineering demolition charges, and even man-carried or vehicle-mounted recoilless rifles. Naval forces have carried weapons that include nuclear-armed naval rockets, depth charges, torpedoes, and naval gunnery shells.

=== Country comparison ===
This table uses the following identifiers:

- — This country has a nuclear mission assigned to this delivery system.
- — This country has never had a nuclear mission assigned to this delivery system.
- — It is unclear if this country has a nuclear mission assigned to this delivery system.
- — This country is developing this delivery system with a nuclear mission envisioned.
- — This country previously assigned a nuclear mission to this delivery system.

Estimated nuclear weapons delivery systems by country, 2026 (Note: Many countries formerly operated a wider range of strategic and especially tactical systems, especially during the Cold War. While most of these are no longer operational, Russia is the only country as of 2025 believed to operate nuclear-armed anti-ballistic missiles, surface-to-air missiles, anti-ship missiles anti-submarine weapons, depth bombs, and torpedoes.)
Reference										
Basing	Type	(United States)	(Russia)	(United Kingdom)	(France)	(China)	(Israel)	(India)	(Pakistan)	(North Korea)
Land	Intercontinental ballistic missile									
Land	Intermediate-range ballistic missile									
Land	Medium-range ballistic missile									
Land	Short-range ballistic missile									
Land	Tactical ballistic missile									
Land	Ground-launched cruise missile									
Sea	Sea-launched ballistic missile									
Sea	Sea-launched cruise missile									
Air	Air-launched ballistic missile									
Air	Air-launched cruise missile									
Air	Gravity bomb									
Depth bomb										

== Triad powers ==
=== China ===
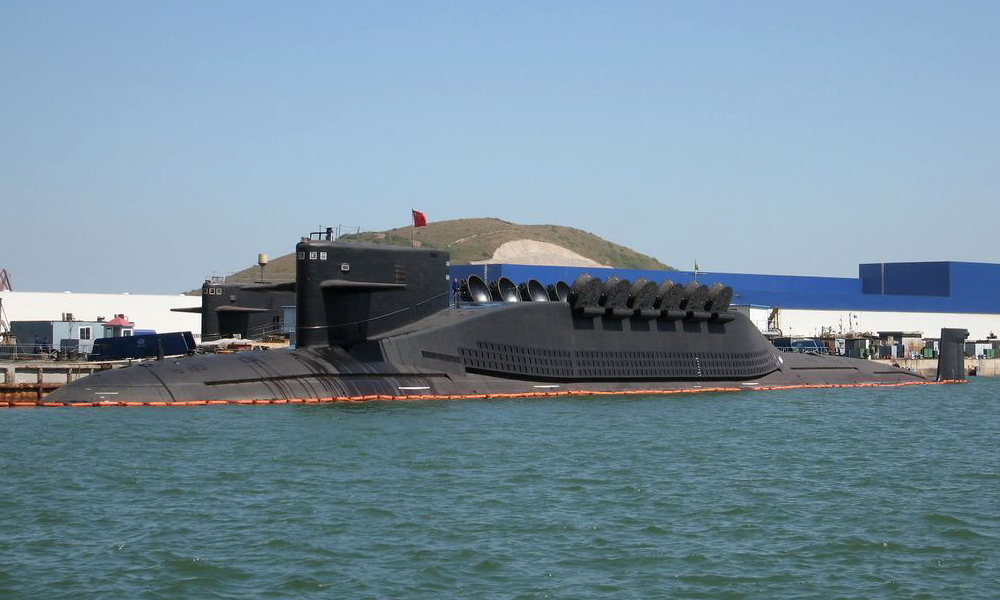
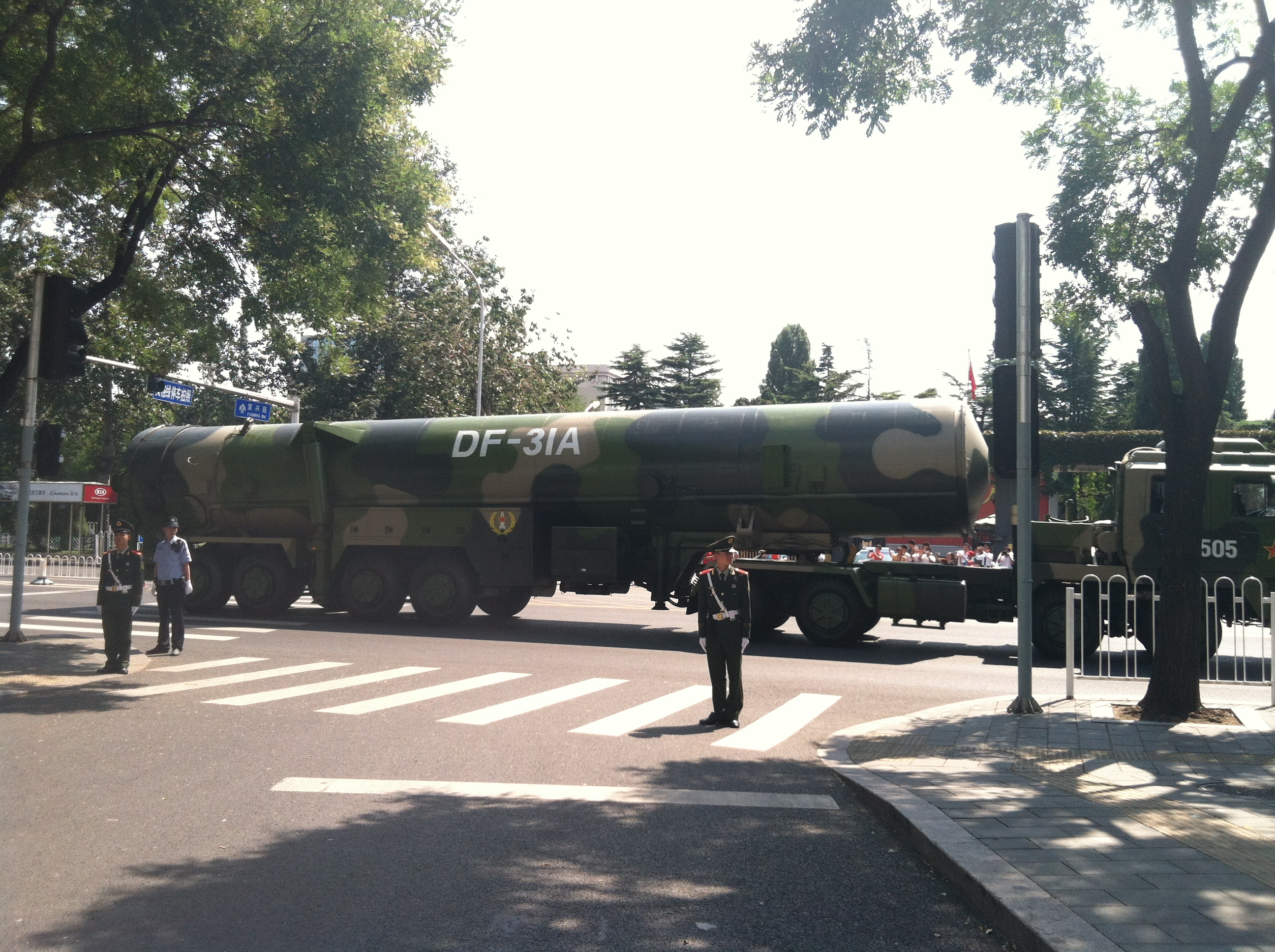
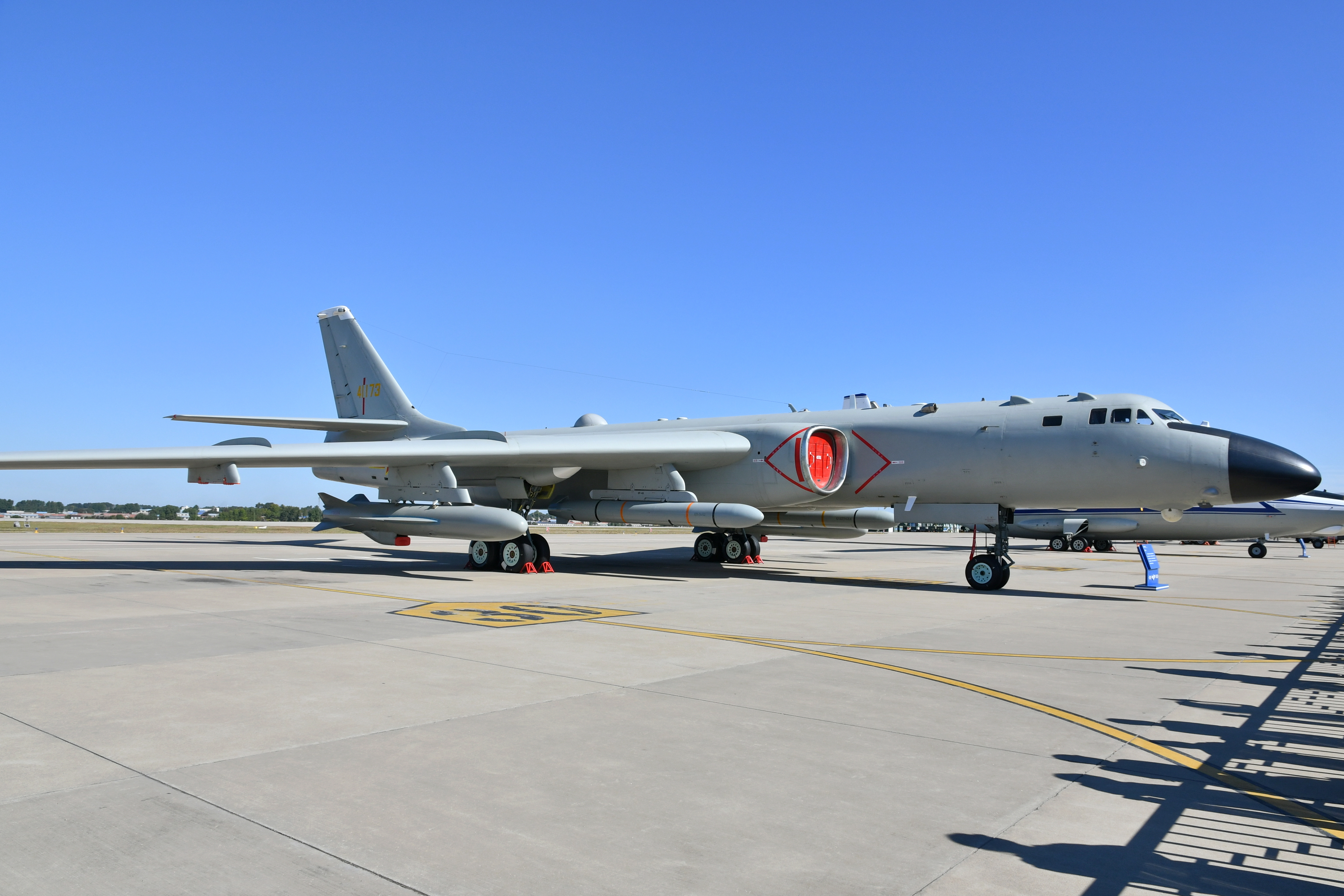
China's nuclear triad – a Type 094-class SSBN, a DF-31 ICBM and a Xi'an H-6 strategic bomber

Unlike the United States and Russia, where strategic nuclear forces are enumerated by treaty limits and subject to verification, China—a nuclear power since 1964—is not subject to these requirements. Instead, China currently has a triad structure smaller than those of Russia and the United States. China's nuclear force is closer in number and capability to those of France or the United Kingdom, making it much smaller than the American or Russian triads. The Chinese nuclear force consists mainly of land-based missiles, including ICBMs, IRBMs, tactical ballistic missiles, and cruise missiles. Unlike the US and Russia, China stores large numbers of its missiles in massive tunnel complexes; U.S. Representative Michael Turner, referring to 2009 Chinese media reports, said "This network of tunnels could be in excess of 5,000 kilometers (3,110 miles) and is used to transport nuclear weapons and forces. The Chinese Army Newsletter calls this system of tunnels the Underground Great Wall of China. China's nuclear warheads are believed to be stored in a central storage facility and not with the launchers.

China currently has one Type 092 submarine which is currently active with JL-1 Submarine Launch Ballistic Missiles (SLBM) according to the Office of Naval Intelligence. In addition, the People's Liberation Army Navy (PLAN) has deployed four newer Type 094 submarines and plans to deploy up to eight of these Jin-class SSBN by the end of 2020. The Type 094 fleet uses JL-2 and JL-3 SLBMs. The Chinese fleet carried out a series of successful JL-2 launches in 2009, 2012 and 2015. The United States expected the 094 SSBN to carry out its first deterrent patrol in 2015 with the JL-2 missiles active. According to Pentagon report, China began to ensure that one nuclear-armed ballistic missile submarine would always on stand by for deterrence around 2023.

There is an aged, upgraded bomber force consisting of Xian H-6s with an uncertain nuclear delivery role. The PLAAF has a limited capability fleet of H-6 bombers modified for aerial refueling as well as forthcoming Russian Ilyushin Il-78 aerial refueling tankers. China has also introduced newer and modernized H-6 variants, including the H-6K and H-6N. The H-6K has enhanced capabilities such as launching long ranged cruise missiles like the CJ-10, while the H-6N is capable of carrying the JL-1. In addition to the H-6 bomber, there are numerous tactical fighter and fighter-bombers such as the J-16, J-10, JH-7A and Su-30 that are all capable of carrying nuclear weapons. It is estimated that China maintains an arsenal of about 250 nuclear warheads and that it has produced about 610 nuclear warheads since becoming a nuclear power in 1964. China is phasing out old liquid-fueled ballistic missiles and arming several new solid-fueled missiles. In the same estimate, it is believed that China has a small inventory of air-delivered nuclear bombs. As well as production is more than likely underway of new warheads for missiles to arm the Jin-class submarines.

The U.S. intelligence community expects that China will increase their total number of warheads and long-range ballistic missiles from about 50 to exceed 100 in the next 15 years, this calculation has been sliding since 2001. Since the end of the Cold War, China is suspected to have doubled their nuclear arsenal, while the other nuclear powers under the Treaty on the Non-Proliferation of Nuclear Weapons have cut their forces in half. A Pentagon report raises the possibility of China moving towards a more vigorous nuclear doctrine that will allow first use of nuclear weapons in times of war. While it is not expected that China will give up the current "no first use" policy in the near future, the Pentagon report raises concerns that "this issue has been and will continue to be debated in China. It remains to be seen, how the introduction of more capable and survivable nuclear systems in greater numbers will shape the terms of this debate or affect Beijing's thinking about nuclear options in the future."

=== India ===
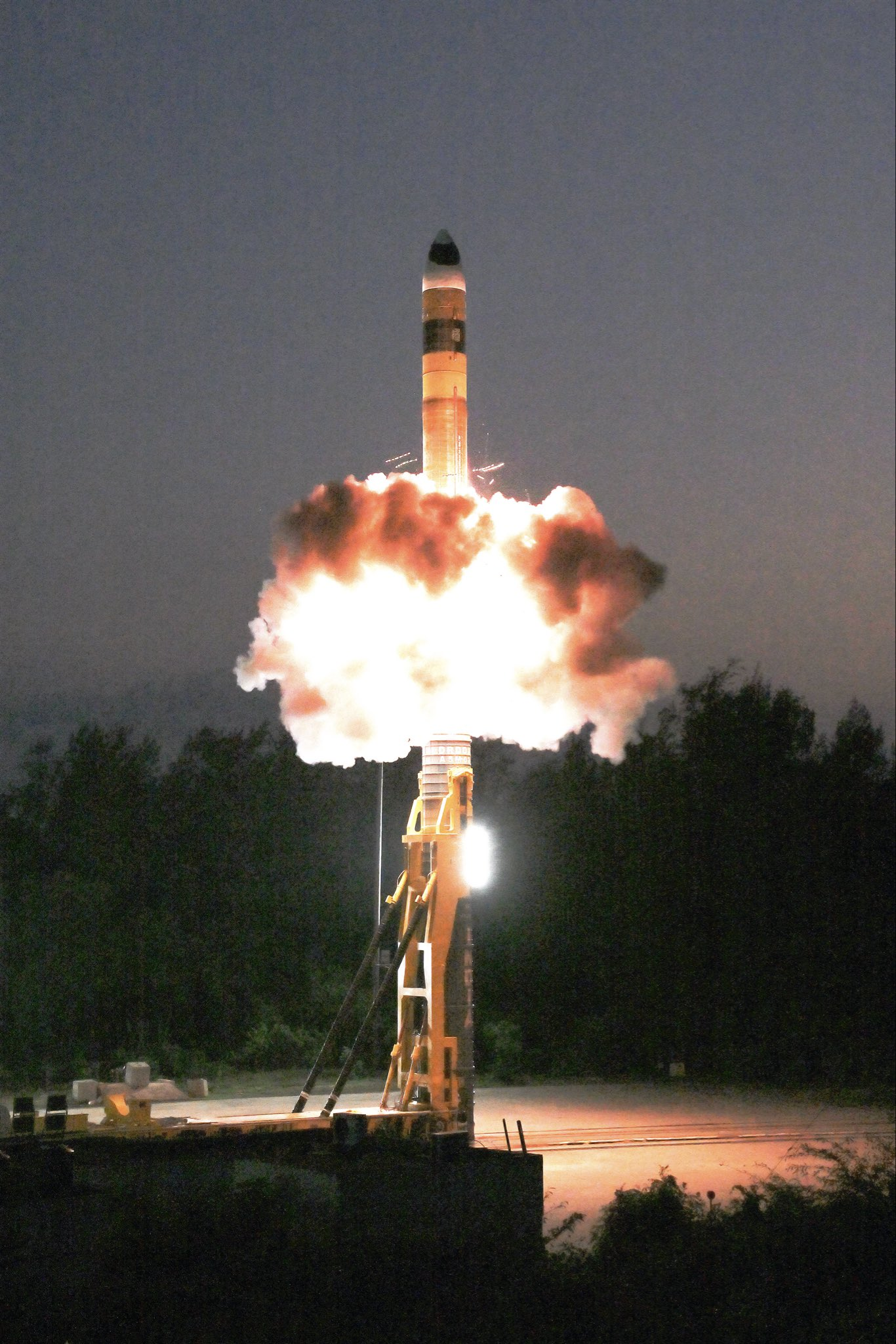
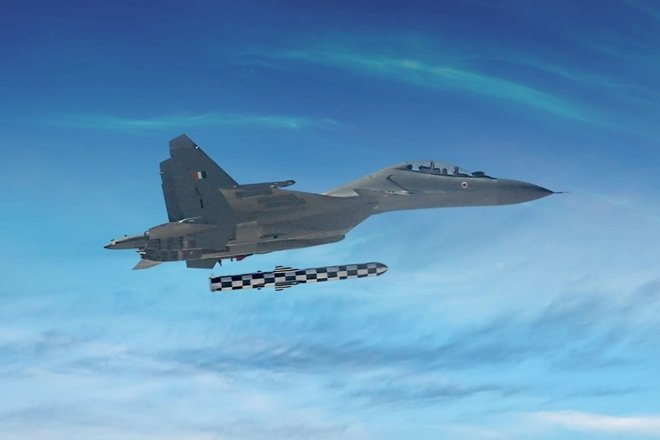
Indian nuclear triad – a Arihant-class SSBN, an Agni ICBM and a Su-30 fighter bomber

India's nuclear weapons policy is that of "no first use" and "minimum credible deterrence," which means that the country will not use nuclear weapons unless they are attacked first, but the country does have the capability to induce the second strike. Before 2016, India already possessed land-based ballistic missiles and aircraft that are nuclear-capable. India's land-based arsenal includes the Prithvi-1 with a range of 150 to 600 kilometres (93 to 373 mi), the Agni-1 with a range of 700 kilometres (430 mi), the Agni-2 with a range of 2,000 kilometres (1,200 mi), Agni-P with a range of 1,000 to 2,000 kilometres (620 to 1,240 mi), Agni-3 with a range of 3,000, the Agni-4 with a range of 3,500 kilometres (2,200 mi), and the Agni-5 with a range of 7,000 kilometres (4,300 mi). These are all intermediate-range ballistic missiles, but the Agni-5 is an intercontinental range ballistic missile. An intermediate-range ballistic missile has a range of 3,000 to 5,000 kilometres (1,900 to 3,100 mi) and intercontinental missiles are missiles with the ability to travel farther than 5,500 kilometres (3,400 mi). In addition, the 5,000–8,000 kilometres (3,100–5,000 mi) range Agni-V ICBM was also successfully tested beginning April 2012 and entered service.

The country currently has four types of bombers that are capable of carrying nuclear bombs. Land and air strike capabilities are under the control of Strategic Forces Command which is a part of Nuclear Command Authority. Their inventory of aircraft includes the Sukhoi Su-30MKI, Mirage 2000H, SEPECAT Jaguar and Rafale, which was purchased from France.

India completed its nuclear triad with the commissioning of INS Arihant in August 2016, which was India's first submarine built indigenously. INS Arihant is a nuclear-powered ballistic missile submarine armed with 12 K-15 missiles with a range of 750 kilometres (470 mi), which later got upgraded with K-4 missiles with an extended range of 3,500 kilometres (2,200 mi). In November 2017, it tested the BrahMos missile from the Sukhoi-30 MKI platform. The INS Arihant was the first SSBN to be completed under India's program. The INS Arighat, India's second ballistic missile submarine was commissioned on 29 August 2024. This was the second SSBN of the three underway to be finished. 2 more improved and bigger Arihant class submarines are under construction, and are planned to be followed by three 13000 tonnes S5-class submarines. After the INS Arihant was completed, India now possesses air-launched nuclear-capable cruise missiles, nuclear-missile-armed submarines and strategic aircraft with nuclear bombs and missiles.

=== Russia ===
==== Soviet Union Cold War (1950–1970) ====
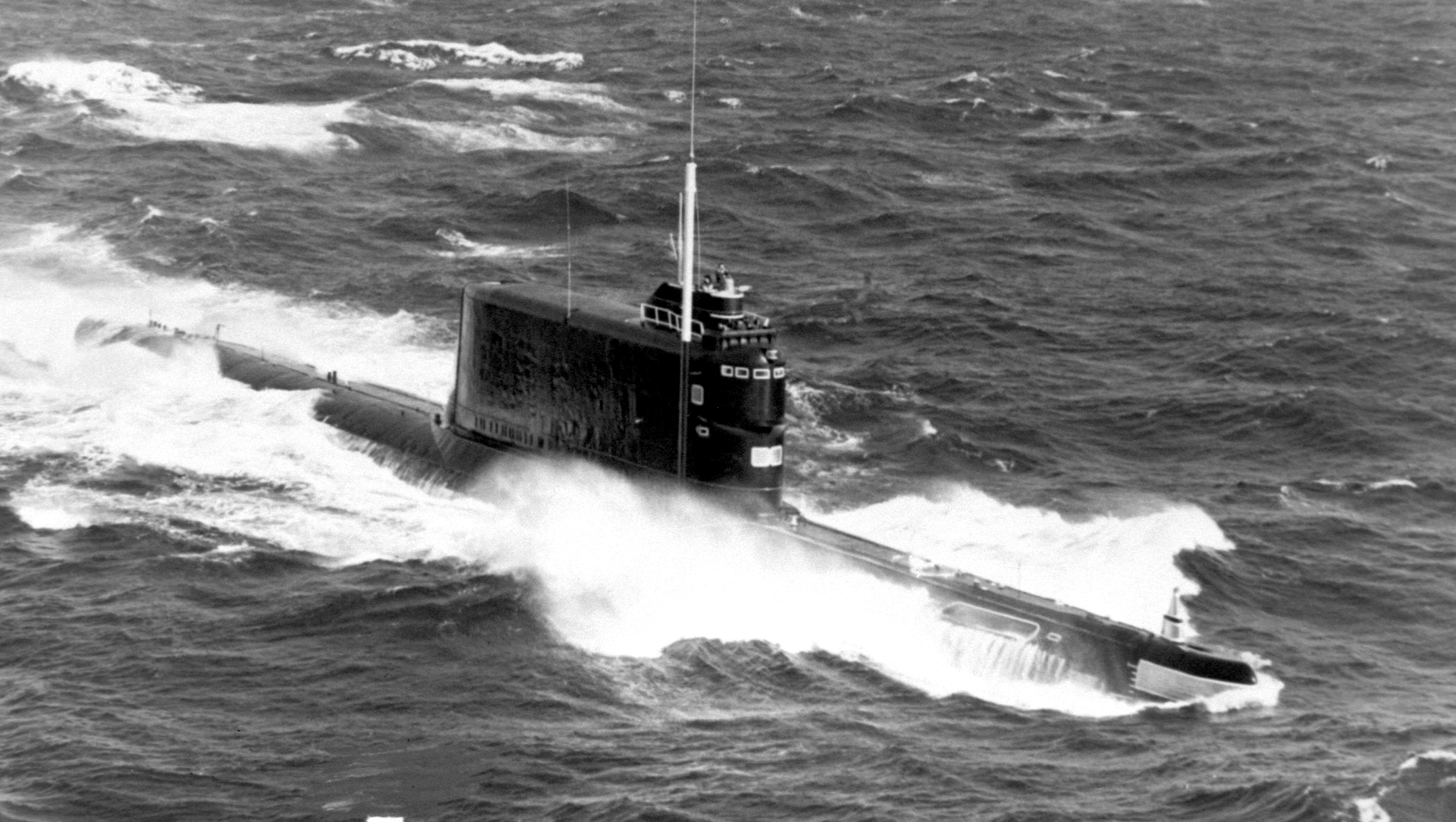
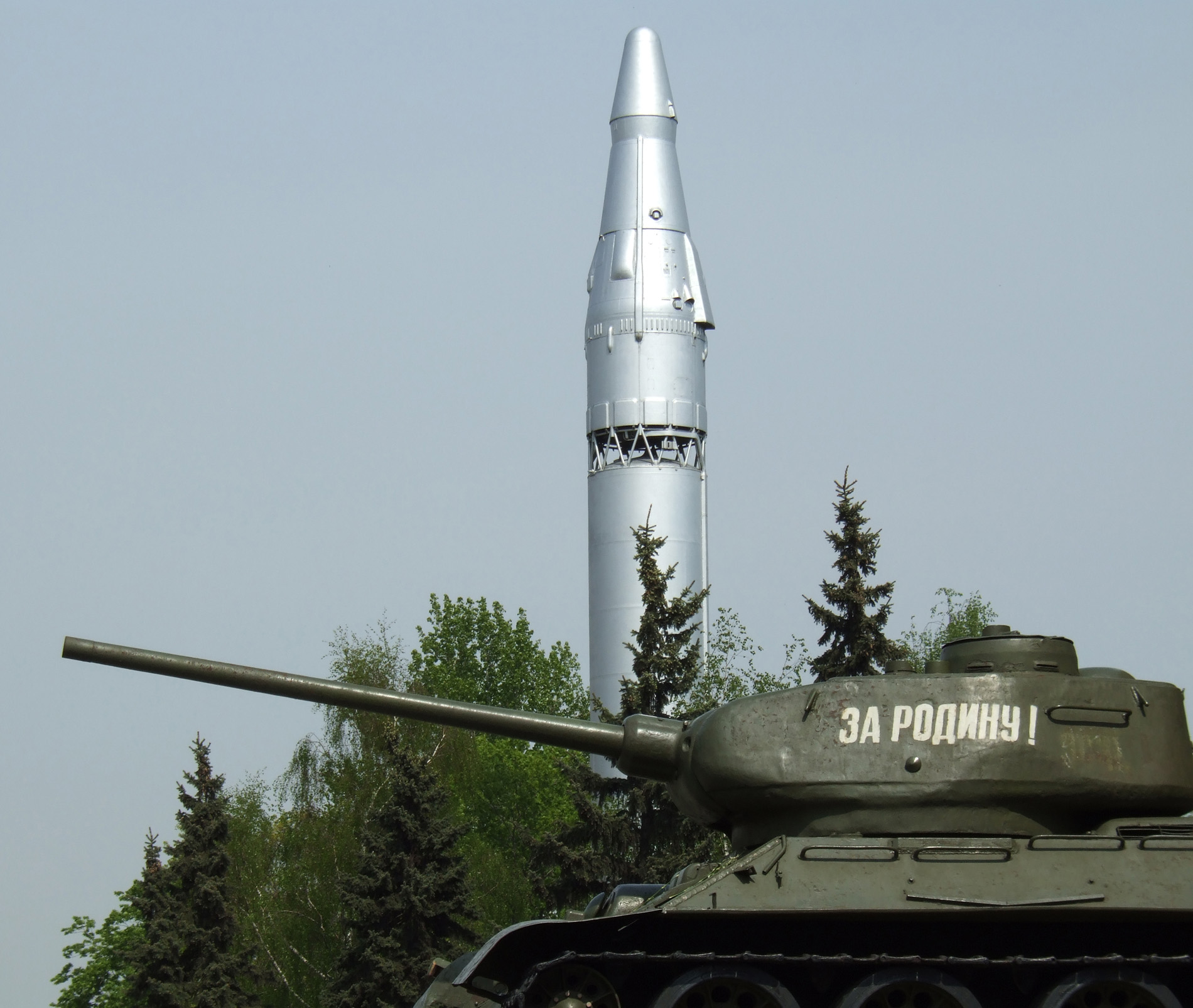
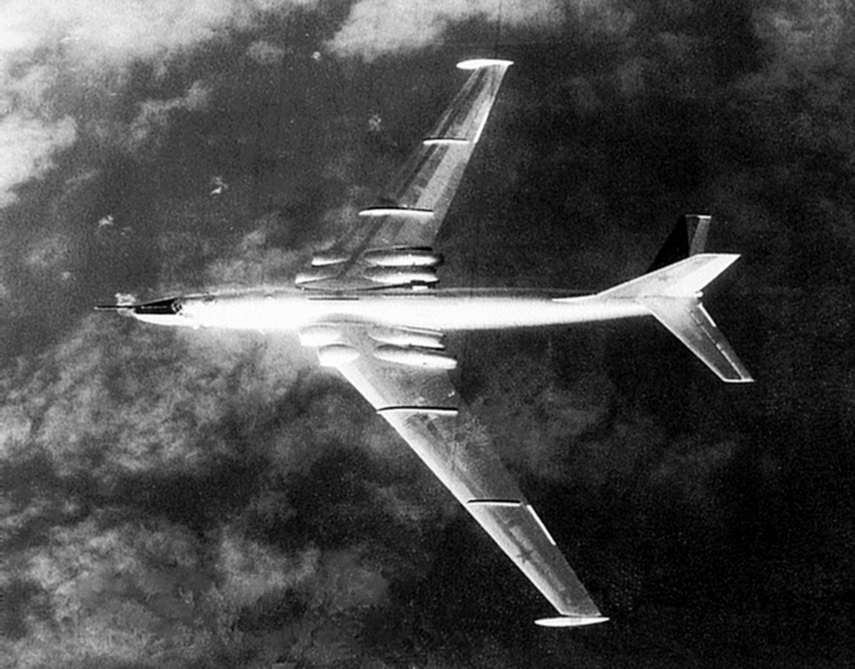
Russia's early nuclear triad – a Project 629 SSB, an R-9 ICBM and a Myasishchev M-4 strategic bomber

The Soviet Union or Union of Soviet Socialist Republics (USSR), of which Russia was the largest and dominant republic, developed its first nuclear weapons only a few years after the United States. The USSR entered the nuclear age in 1949 with their imitation of the American Fat Man plutonium implosion design. Although the Soviet Union was behind the U.S. in the years following World War II in terms of nuclear technology development, the Russians soon closed the gap. By 1953, the U.S. successfully tested the world's first hydrogen device, Ivy Mike with a yield of about 10 megatonnes of TNT (42 PJ). It was only two years later on 12 August 1955 that the Soviet Union successfully tested their own hydrogen bomb, the RDS-6 (known as Joe-4 in America).

The development of the ICBM (Inter-continental Ballistic Missile) was led by the Soviet Union. The first-ever mid-range ballistic missile, R-5M, was created by the Soviet Union and accepted for military service on 21 July 1956. This missile had a range of 700 miles (1,100 km) with a yield of 1 megatonne of TNT (4.2 PJ). From its acceptance in 1956 until 1968 there were 48 launchers with R-5M ballistic missiles equipped with nuclear warheads deployed by the Soviet Union.

The former Soviet Union also led the way in the development of the third part of the nuclear triad, SLBM's. They launched the first SLBM, with an R-11FM ballistic missile in 1956, and in 1957 introduced submarines with two R-11FM's in 1957. However, these early submarines had to be surfaced in order to launch their missiles. It is in this aspect that the U.S. became the leader when they deployed the first SSBN, USS George Washington (SSBN-598), in 1959 with Polaris A-1 missiles able to be launched underwater, and the first successful underwater launch of a ballistic missile was in July 1960. It was not until 1963 that the Soviet Union was able to match the U.S. feat in this regard, with an R-21 missile. There was also a considerable gap between the United States employment of MRVs and MIRVs on SLBMs to that of the Russians, which the U.S. had achieved as early as 1964.

==== Soviet Union Cold War (1970–1990) ====
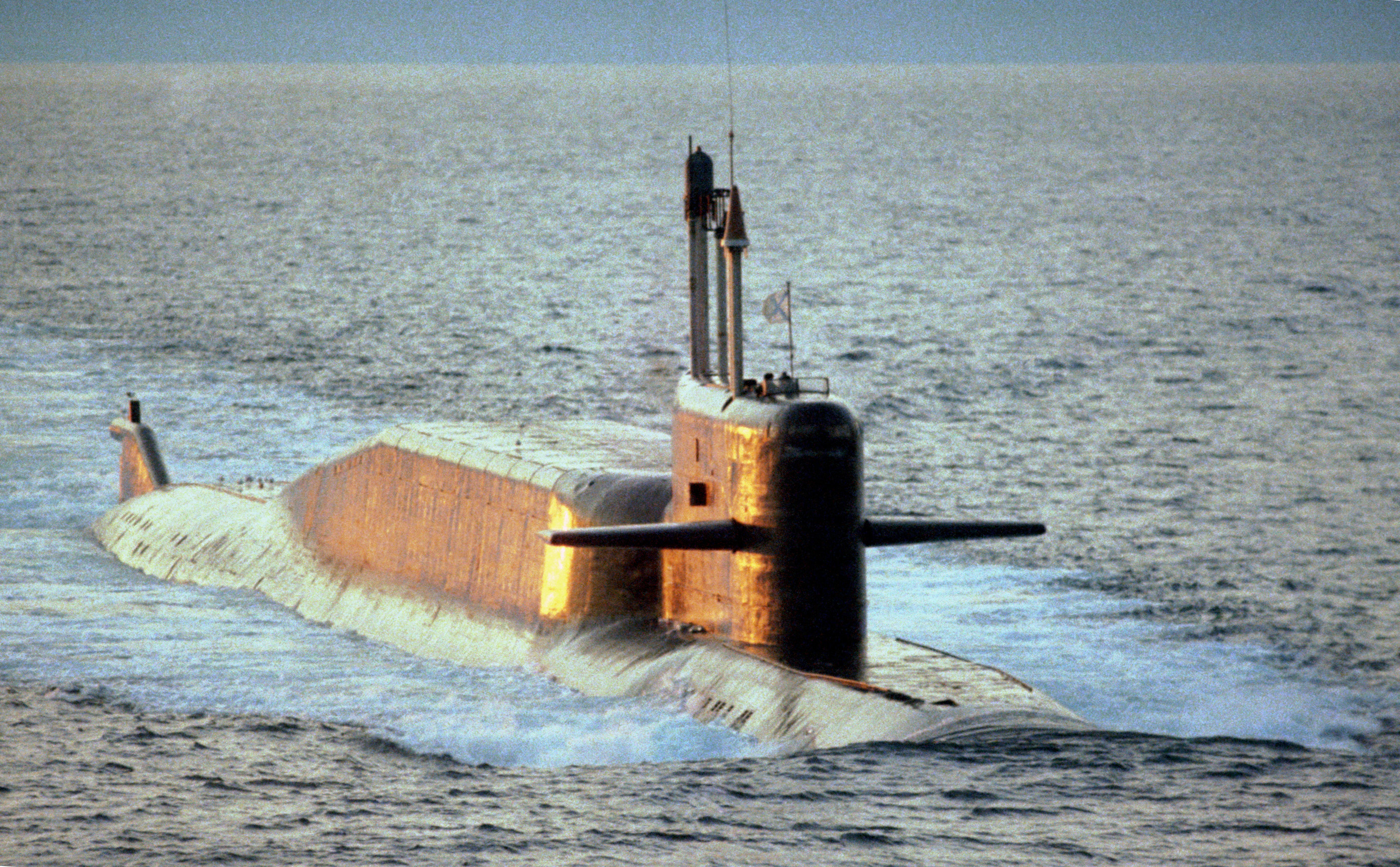
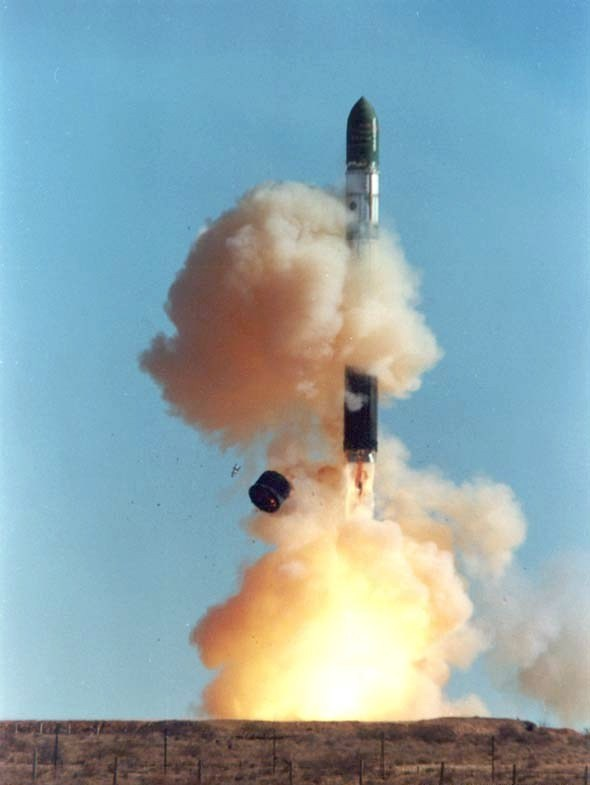
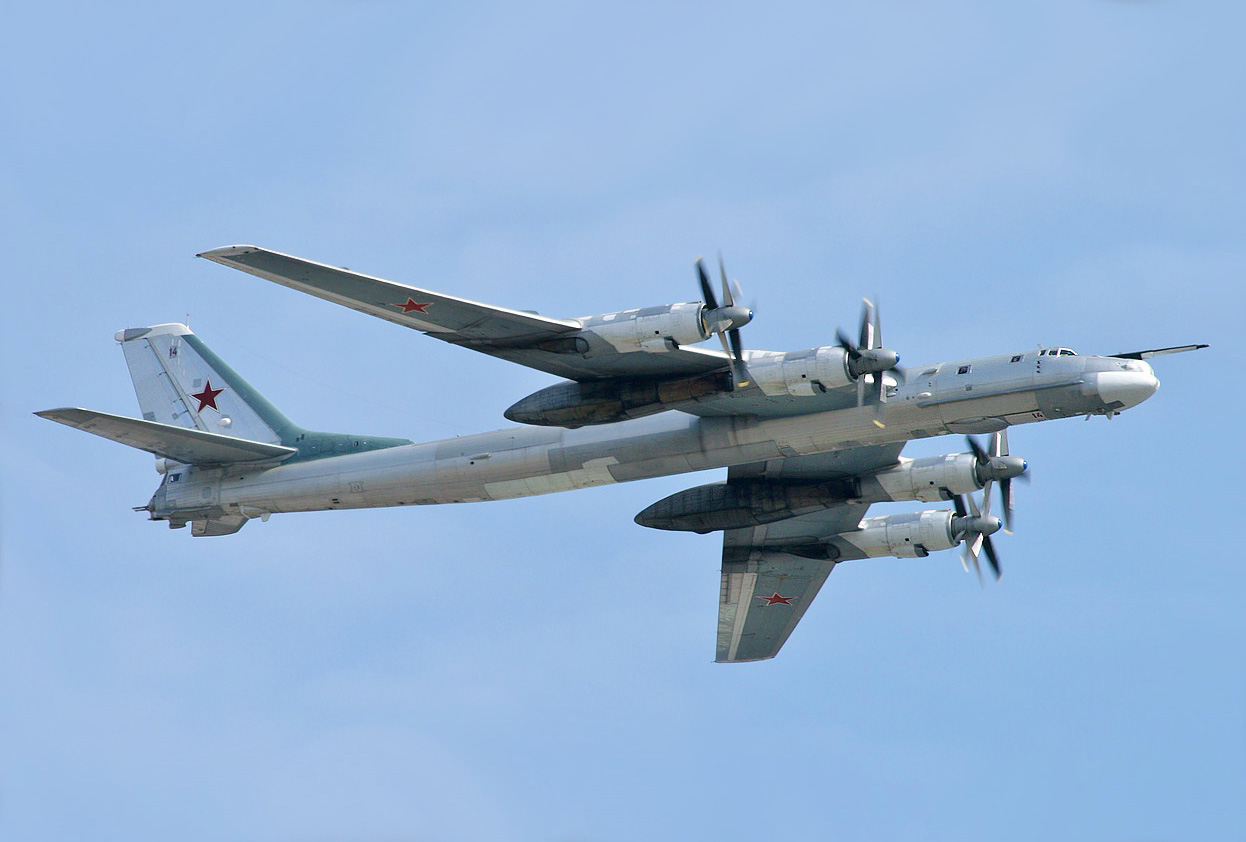
Russia's late Cold War nuclear triad – a Project 667BDRM Delfin SSBN, an R-36M2 ICBM and a Tupolev Tu-95 strategic bomber

After the creation of ICBMs and improvements on distance and accuracy had been achieved, the modernization of the Soviet nuclear arsenal was undertaken. The first "shrapnel" MRVs (Multiple reentry vehicles) were successfully tested by 1970 with the R-36 (or SS-9) ICBM, and their deployment followed the next year. This meant that a single missile would now contain multiple nuclear warheads. Further development using the R-36 heavy ICBM type created the R-36M (SS-18). MRV's evolved into MIRVs, which did not function as dispersal devices, but rather allowed independent targets for the multiple nuclear warheads. MIRV as well as single warhead R-36 ICBMS were deployed by the Soviet Union in 1975. The next generation of the Soviet ICBM was the R-36M UTTH, which increased the accuracy of the warhead and allowed for innovations that allowed the missiles to carry up to 8 warheads. The final improved generated the R-36M2 Voevoda, which allowed even more accurate attacks and increased the number of warheads to 10. Some "light" ICBMs developed by the Soviet Union included the UR-100N (SS-19) and the MR-UR-100 (SS-17), with lower launch weights and fewer warhead capabilities. MRVs, unlike MIRVs which allowed for independent targeting, had a downside known as the "fratricide effect", which refers to the inability to distance multiple warheads from each other, allowing the chance for the initial explosion to destroy the other warheads.

By 1975, there were around 1600 ICBM launchers deployed by the Soviet Union. Not only did this number exceed American estimates, but the addition of MRVs and MIRVs further amplified the destructive capabilities of Soviet ICBMs. These launchers also utilized the increases in accuracy and range from the SS-17, SS-18, SS-19 ICBM silo-based types. One final advent to the Soviet Union's development of ICBMs was the mobile-launcher SS-20 type.

MIRVs were not mentioned in the SALT I treaty (Strategic Arms Limitation Treaty) between the US and USSR in 1972, and consequently were insignificantly limited in the SALT II treaty of 1979. As a result, the increase in ICBM launchers and nuclear warheads continued by both countries. It is thought that the Soviet Union attained an advantage regarding ICBMs by the late 1970s.

In 1974, the USSR deployed SS-N-6, the first Soviet SSBN with shrapnel MRV nuclear warheads. Three years later, the Soviet Navy deployed their first SLBM with MIRV warheads, the SS-N-18 missile

As the 1980s came about, the new technology of cruise-missiles significantly altered deterrence strategies in both the US and Soviet Union. At this point, the nuclear triad maintained its importance in ensuring a second-strike capability

==== Russia Post-Cold War ====
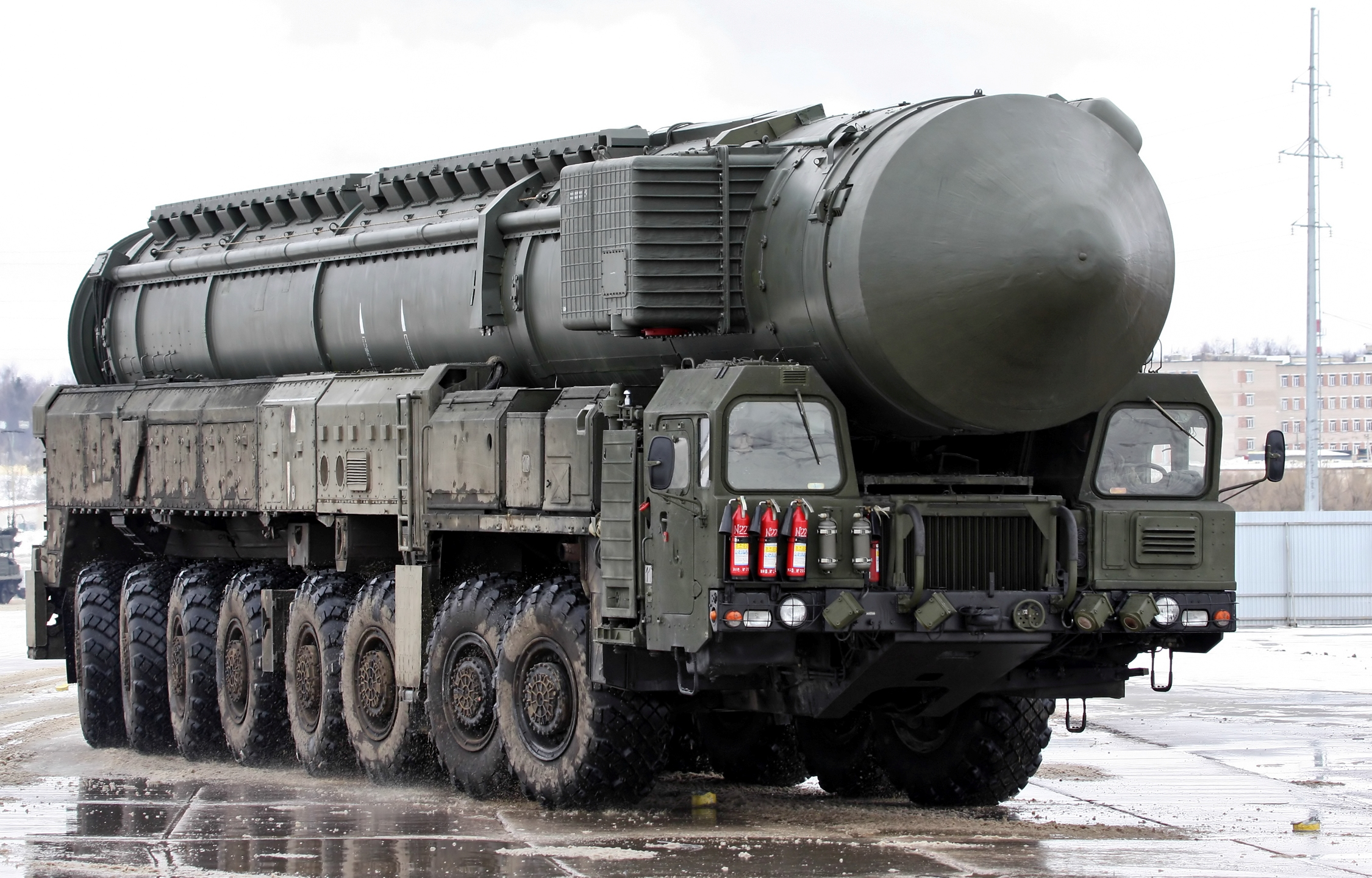
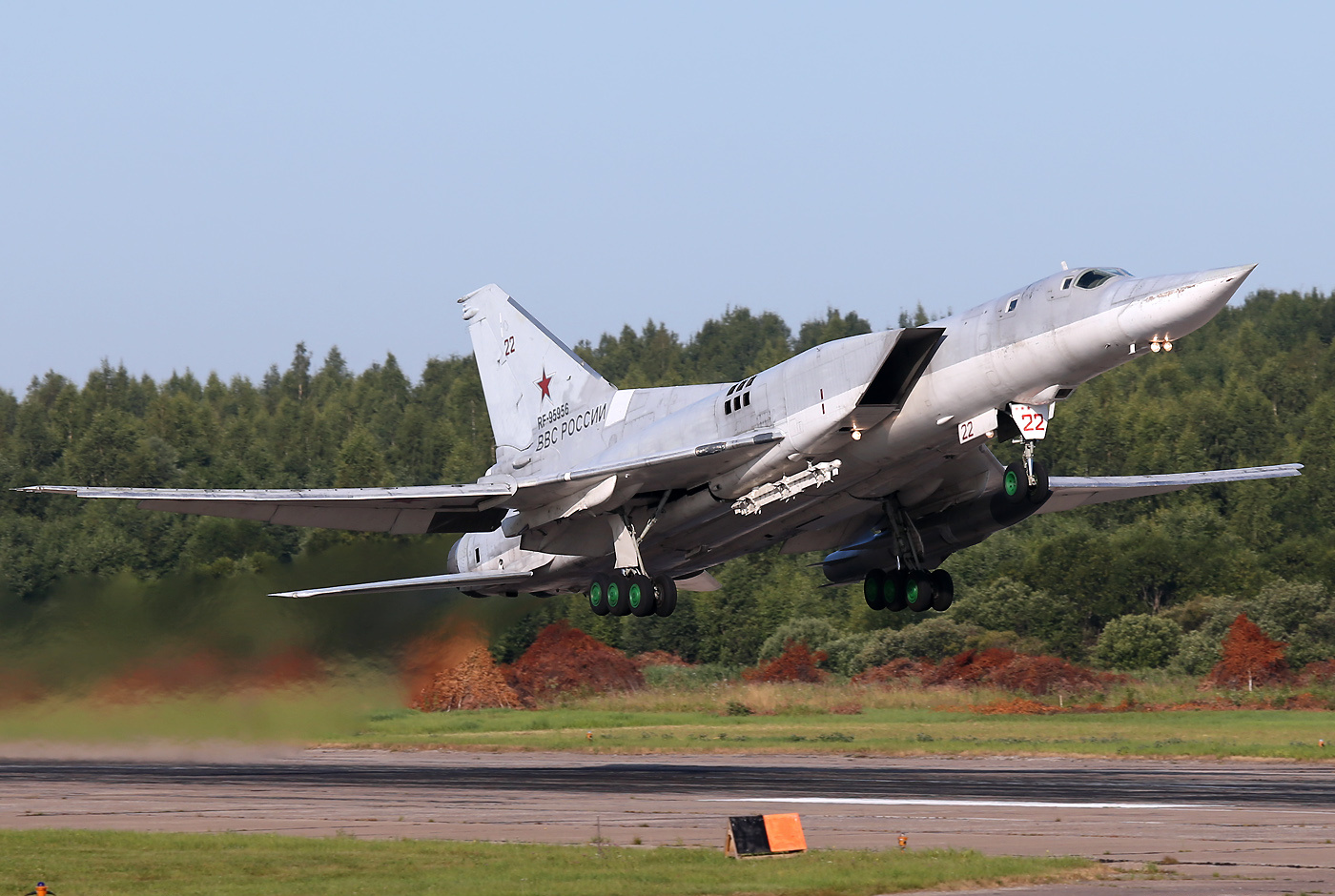
Russia's modern nuclear triad – a Project 955 Borei-class SSBN, MZKT-79221 Transporter erector launcher for the RT-2PM2 Topol-M ICBM and a Tupolev Tu-22M strategic bomber

Russia inherited the arsenal of all of the former Soviet states; this consists of silo-based as well as rail and road mobile ICBMs, sea-based SLBMs, strategic bombers, strategic aerial refueling aircraft, and long-range tactical aircraft capable of carrying gravity bombs, standoff missiles, and cruise missiles. The Russian Strategic Rocket Forces have ICBMs capable of delivering nuclear warheads: silo-based R-36M2 (SS-18), silo-based UR-100N (SS-19), mobile RT-2PM "Topol" (SS-25), silo-based RT-2UTTH "Topol M" (SS-27), mobile RT-2UTTH "Topol M" (SS-27), mobile RS-24 "Yars" (SS-29) (Future replacement for R-36 and UR-100N missiles). Russian strategic nuclear submarine forces are equipped with the following SLBMs:

- R-29R "Vysota", NATO name SS-N-18 "Stingray"; RSM-54 R-29RMU "Sineva", NATO name SS-N-23 "Skiff"; and the R-29RMU2.1 "Liner". These are in use with the Delta-class submarine.
- RSM-56 R-30 "Bulava", NATO name SS-NX-32, for the Borei-class submarines.

The Russian Long Range Aviation operates supersonic Tupolev Tu-22M, and Tupolev Tu-160 bombers and the long range turboprop powered Tupolev Tu-95. They are all mostly armed with strategic stand off missiles or cruise missiles such as the KH-15 and the KH-55/Kh-102. These bombers and nuclear capable strike aircraft such as the Sukhoi Su-24 are supported by Ilyushin Il-78 aerial refuelling aircraft.

The USSR was required to destroy its stock of IRBMs in accordance with the INF treaty.

=== United States ===
==== Nuclear triad during the early Cold War (1950–1970) ====
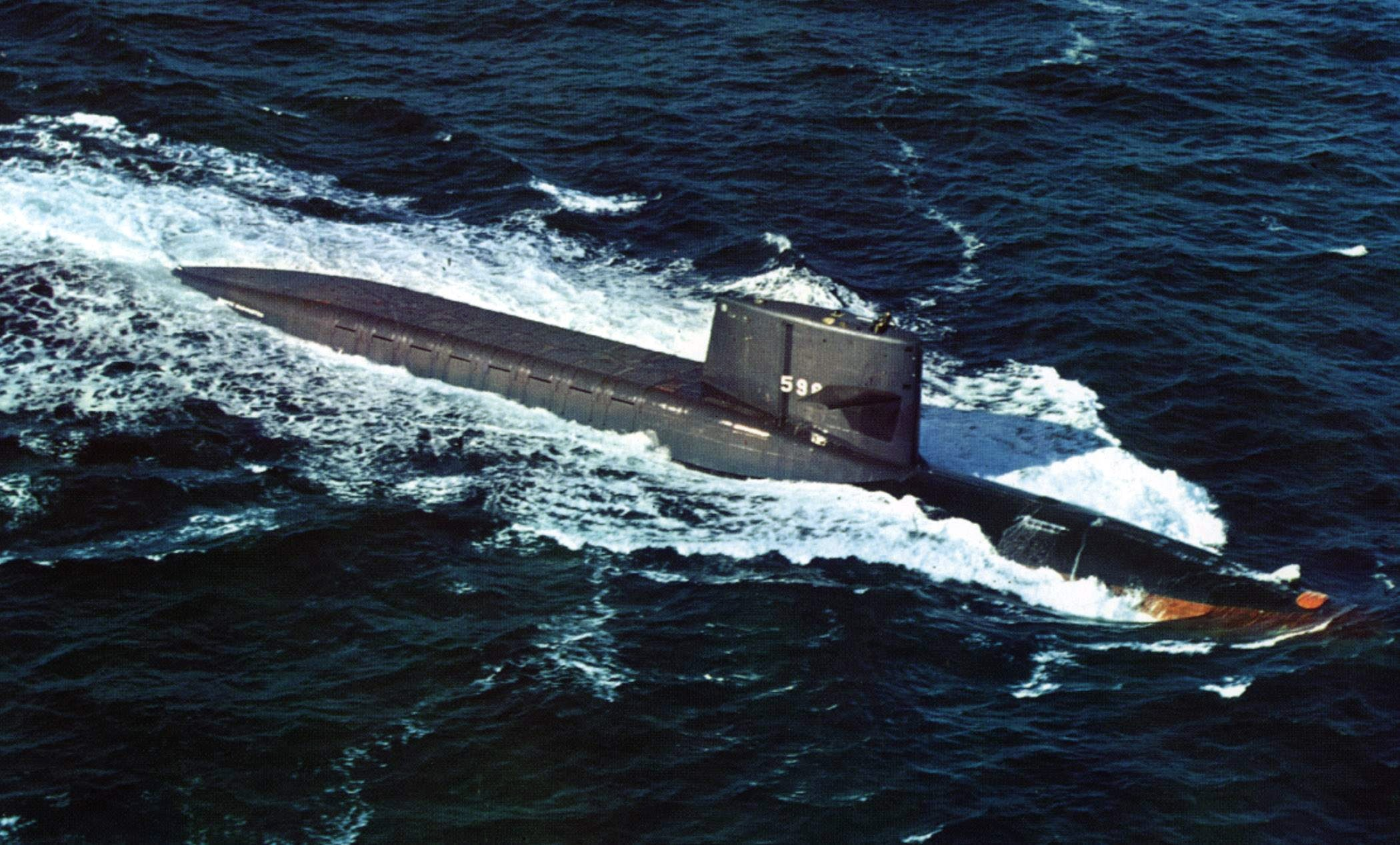
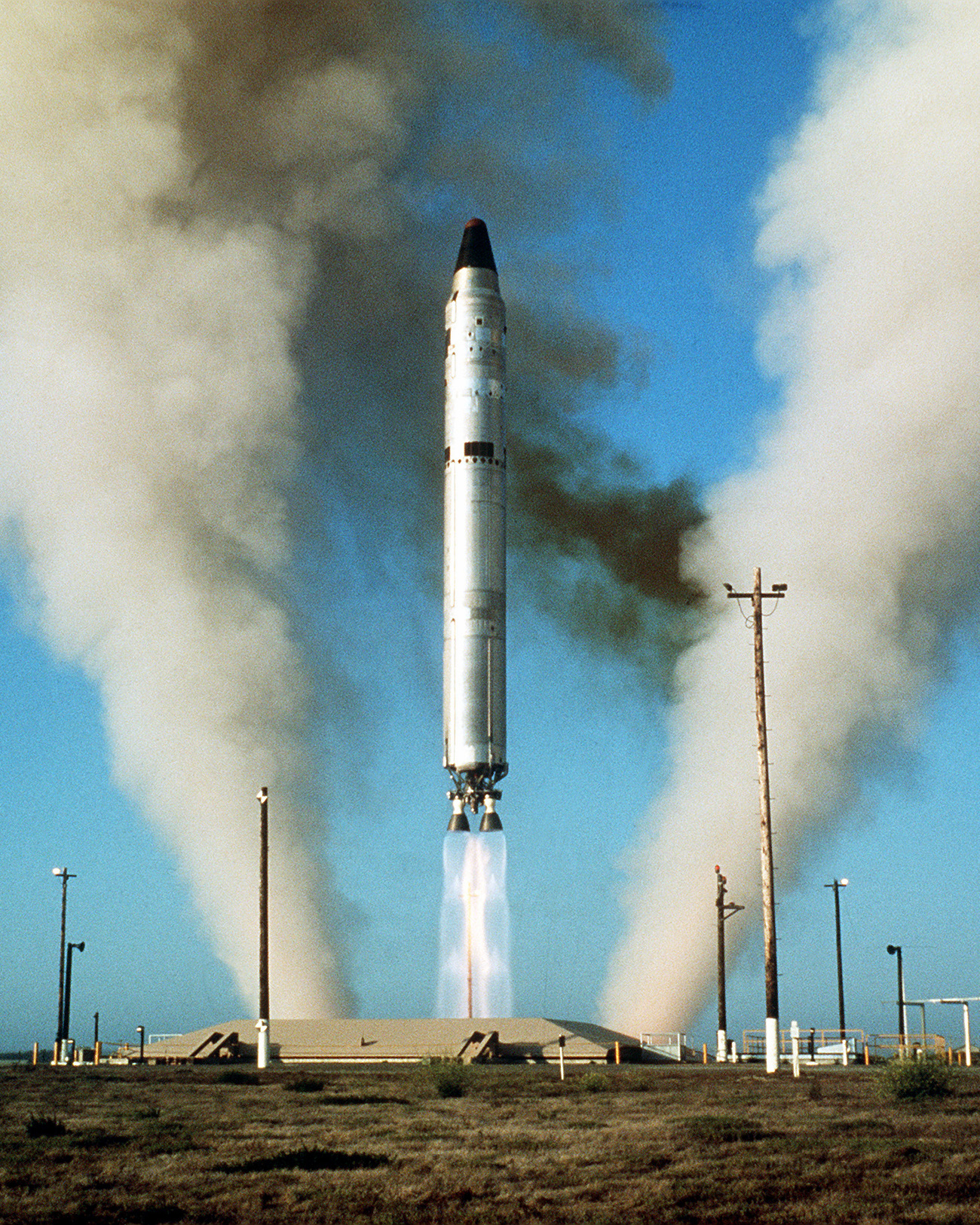
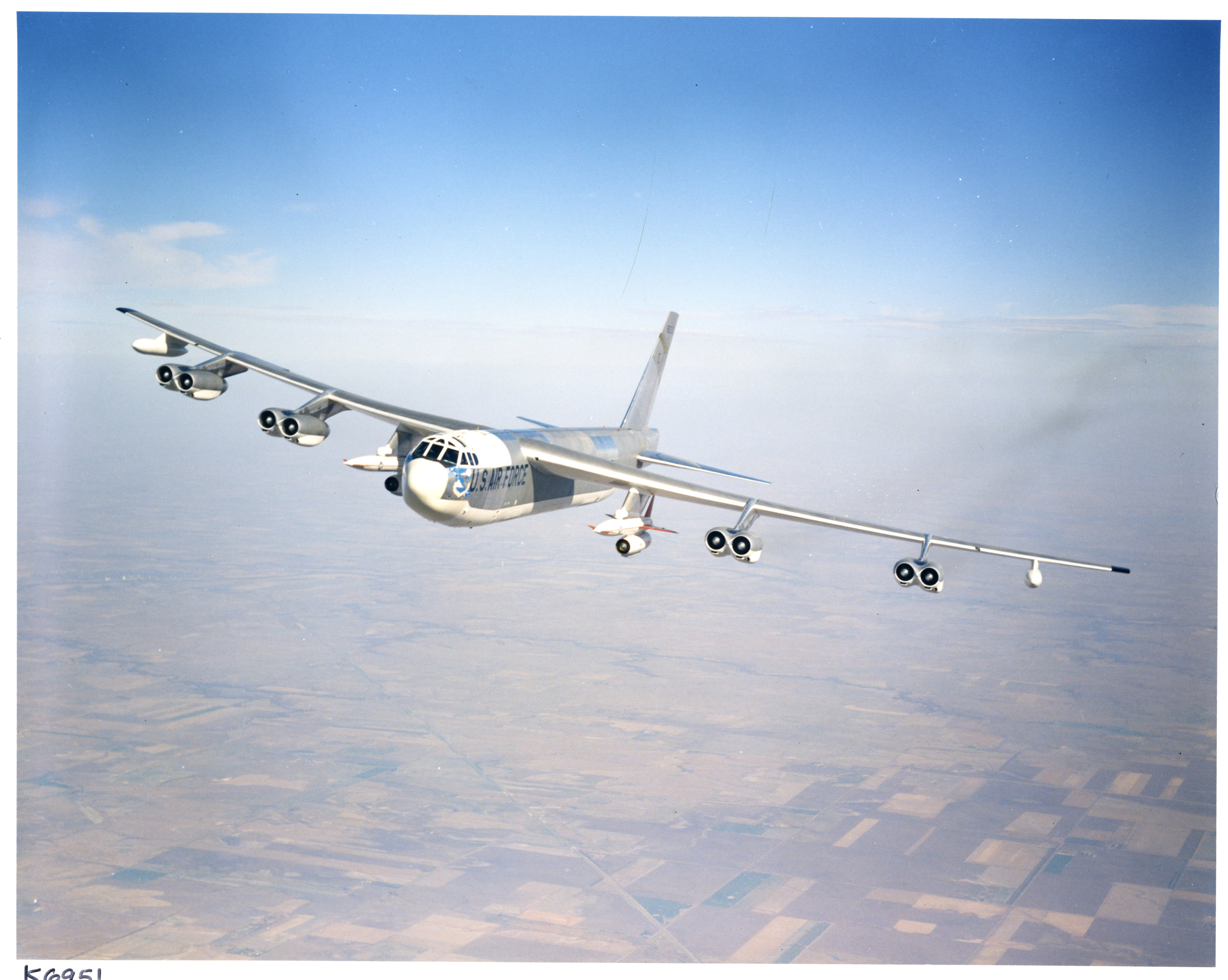
The elements of the US nuclear triad in the 1960s – a George Washington-class SSBN carrying UGM-27 Polaris SLBMs, an LGM-25C Titan II ICBM and a B-52G Stratofortress strategic bomber carrying two AGM-28 Hound Dog ALCMs and internal bombs

The origins of the United States' nuclear triad can be traced back to the 1940s, but full development was not achieved until the end of the 1950s. Its initial motivation for developing the program was that the Navy, Army, and Air Force all wanted to play a role in the operation of the country's nuclear arsenal. During this period the 'legs' of the triad were unstable, the advance of technology caused rapid obsolescence of weapon systems after only a few years; only the development of SLBMs began to give some stability to the arms race.

The United States desired the nuclear triad because it would give them a variety of platforms to deliver a deadly strike to the Soviet Union. Forcing the Soviet Union to put focus on potential attacks from the land, air, and sea would give the United States a significant advantage in terms of deterrence. Specifically, the nuclear triad was viewed as a way to complicate Soviet first strike and attack planning as well as ensure the survivability of U.S. assets.

During this timeframe the U.S. also created the triad by reducing the number of delivery systems, especially by ending any strategic role for Navy crewed aircraft. A transonic seaplane capable of delivering nuclear weapons, the P6M SeaMaster, would be canceled in 1959. A carrier-based supersonic strategic bomber, the A-5 Vigilante, would be withdrawn from that role in 1963 and converted to the strategic reconnaissance role; its subsonic predecessors were retired in 1959 (A-2 Savage) or converted to non-bombing roles (A-3 Skywarrior); tactical nuclear weapons would remain on Navy ships for tactical aircraft and anti-submarine missiles and torpedoes. Excepting the AGM-28 Hound Dog, all operational cruise missiles of the era (SM-62 Snark, RGM-6 Regulus, MGM-1 Matador and MGM-13 Mace) would be retired by 1971. Overlaps between the Army and Air Force ballistic missile programs, such as the Army PGM-19 Jupiter and the Air Force PGM-17 Thor IRBMs, would be eliminated.

ICBMs were viewed by the United States as the means to attack hardened targets within the Soviet Union such as underground bunkers. Stored in protective "coffins" and later in underground silos, the newer long range missiles were accurate and could be fired quickly. During the early Cold War, the United States maintained multiple different types of ICBMs. This portion of the triad consisted of the following missiles: the CGM/HGM-16 Atlas, HGM-25A Titan I, LGM-25C Titan II, LGM-30A/B Minuteman I, and LGM-30F Minuteman II missiles. All of these were armed with a single warhead. The Atlas missiles would be retired in 1964, the Titan I missiles in 1965, and the Minuteman I missiles would be retired by 1970.

In terms of submarine launched missiles, the United States utilized various classes of submarines as the delivery vehicles. Missile submarines played an especially important role in terms of strategic deterrence. These submarines were extremely hard to locate and could be positioned right off of enemy coastlines. In terms of the nuclear triad, this leg was meant to be the most survivable. The United States commissioned various classes of submarines throughout the Cold War as new improvements were made to each class. The first submarines to carry nuclear weapons were a collection of five boats equipped with the Regulus cruise missile, which were employed in the Pacific as part of the regular strategic deterrent from 1959 to 1964. The Regulus boats were essentially a stop-gap until sufficient ballistic missile submarines became available. Referred to as the "41 for Freedom," the George Washington, Ethan Allen, Lafayette, James Madison, and Benjamin Franklin classes were all commissioned between 1959 and 1967. These classes of submarines carried 16 UGM-27 Polaris A-1/A-2/A-3 missiles each; the first two had one warhead, the A-3 had three multiple reentry vehicle (MRV) warheads.

Rounding out the United States' nuclear triad during the early Cold War were its long-range bombers. This leg of the nuclear triad was the most versatile since bombers could be moved quickly and recalled if necessary to avoid unnecessary strikes. The U.S. bomber force during this timeframe consisted of the B-29 Superfortress, B-36 Peacemaker, North American B-45 Tornado, B-47 Stratojet, B-50 Superfortress, B-52 Stratofortress, B-57 Canberra, and B-58 Hustler. The B-29s, B-45s, and B-50s would be removed from the bombing role in the mid-1950s, the B-36s would be retired in 1959, the B-47s would be retired in 1966, the B-57s would be removed from the bombing role in the mid-1960s, and the B-58s would be retired in 1970. Some B-52s would be equipped with single warhead AGM-28 Hound Dog air launched cruise missiles (ALCMs).

Throughout the 1960s, the United States steadily commissioned increasing numbers of delivery vehicles capable of carrying nuclear warheads. In 1967, the greatest number of deployment ready delivery vehicles of the decade was recorded at 2,268.

==== Nuclear triad during the late Cold War (1970–1990) ====
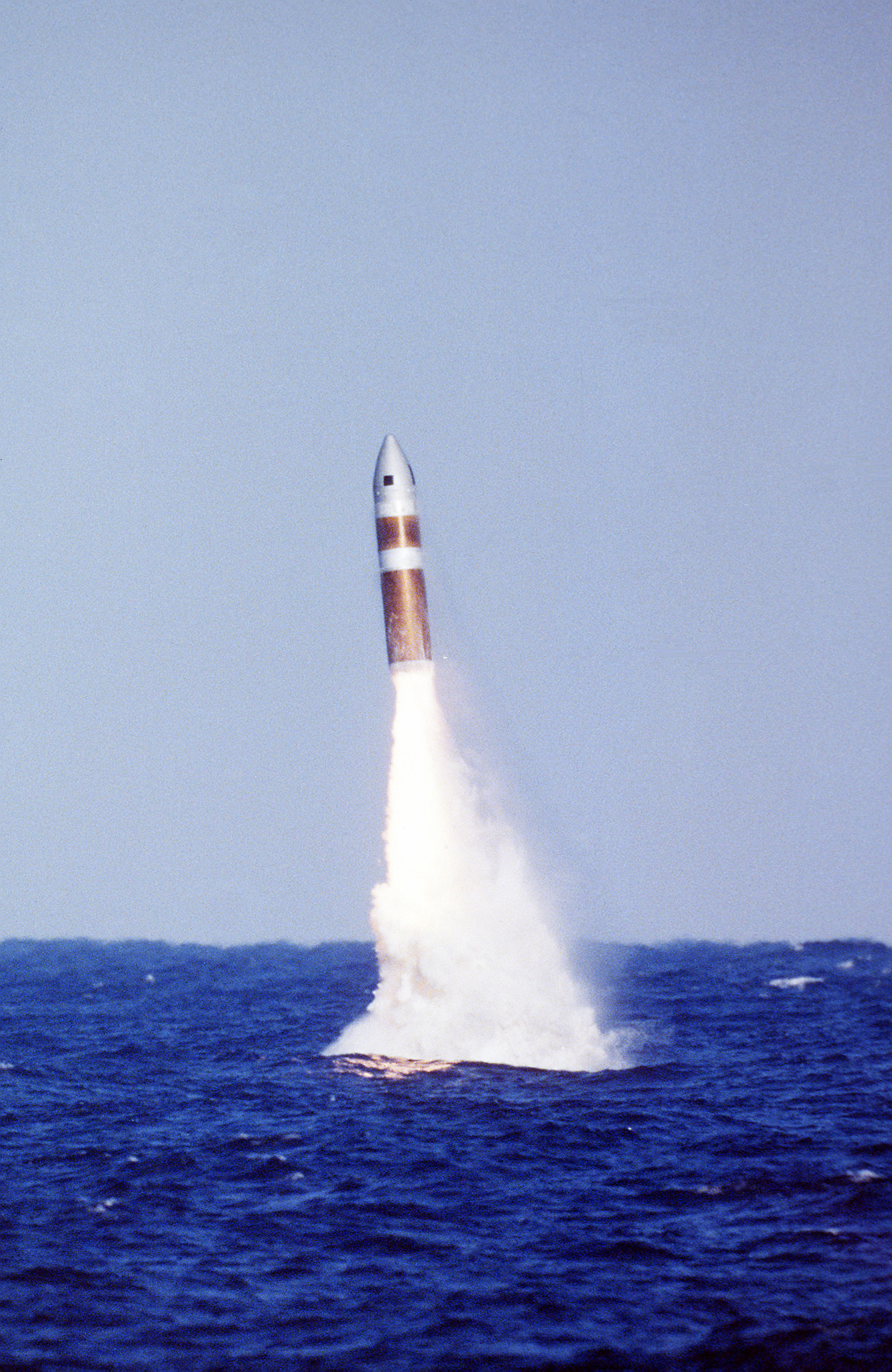
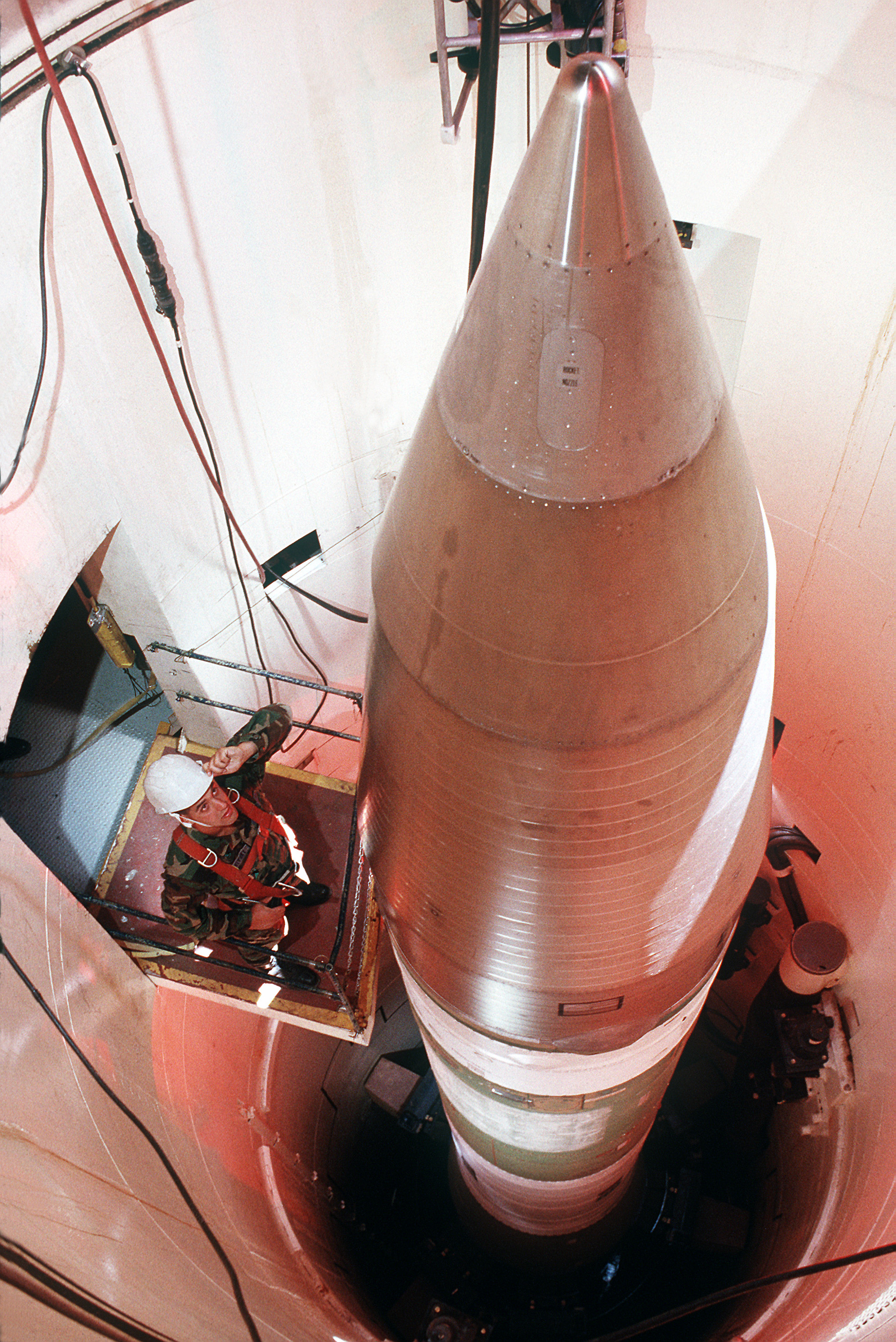
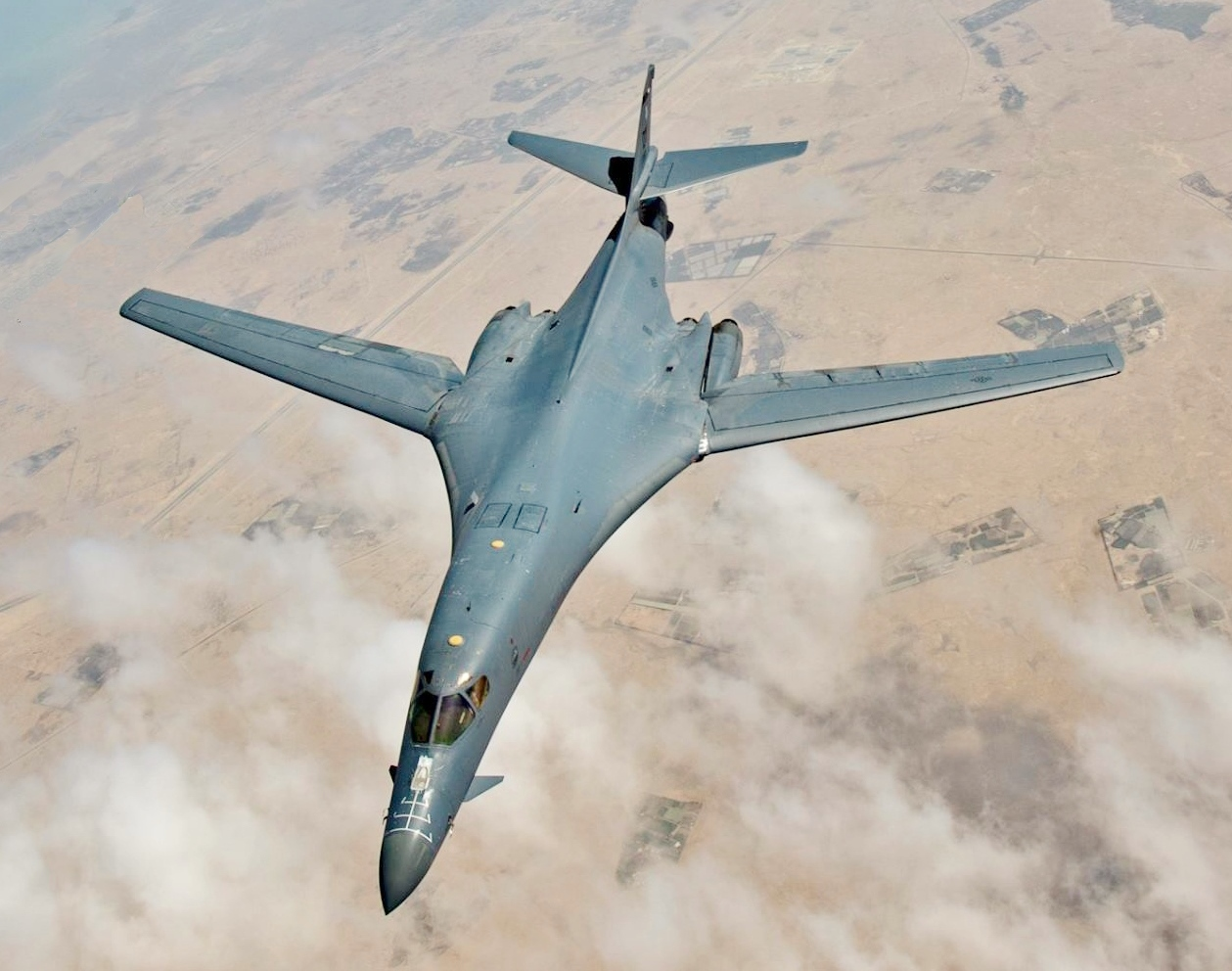
The elements of the US nuclear triad in the 1980s – test launch of a UGM-73 Poseidon C-3 SLBM, a LGM-30G Minuteman III ICBM in its silo, and a B-1 Lancer bomber

In 1970, a significant change brought about a dramatic increase in the nuclear arsenal. The 1970s saw a large increase in delivery vehicles and warheads because of the introduction of the multiple independent reentry vehicle (MIRV), which allowed for the deployment of ICBMs and SLBMs that could carry multiple warheads. Up until 1990 and the Strategic Arms Reduction Treaty (START) with the Soviet Union, the number of delivery vehicles possessed by the United States hovered between 1,875 and 2,200.

During the late Cold War, the United States continued to maintain multiple different types of ICBMs. This portion of the triad consisted of Titan II missiles (single warhead), Minuteman II missiles (single warhead), LGM-30G Minuteman III missiles (three-warhead), and LGM-118 Peacekeeper missiles (ten-warhead). The Titan II would be retired in 1987. The ICBM count for the United States in 1990 included 2,450 warheads in 1,000 ICBMs.

In the late Cold War most of the Polaris SSBNs would be converted to carry the UGM-73 Poseidon C-3 (10 or 14 warheads) and later the UGM-96 Trident C-4 missiles (up to 8 warheads) - the George Washington and Ethan Allen classes could not be upgraded to the new missiles. Along with the "41 for Freedom" classes, the United States also commissioned 18 Ohio-class submarines before and after the Cold War's end. Ohio-class submarines carried Trident C-4 and later the UGM-133 Trident D-5 missiles (up to 12 warheads). In 1990, the United States was in possession of around 600 SLBMs and 5,216 warheads.

The U.S. bomber force during the late Cold War consisted of the B-52H and B-52G Stratofortress, FB-111A Aardvark, and B-1 Lancer. By 1990, the United States possessed 94 B-52H bombers, 76 FB-111 bombers, 96 B-1 bombers, and 2 B-2 bombers, along with a total of almost 5,000 available weapons. The FB-111s would all be retired by 1993. All of these aircraft could carry AGM-69 Short Range Attack Missiles (SRAMs) and AGM-86 ALCMs.

==== Nuclear triad after the Cold War (1990–2010) ====
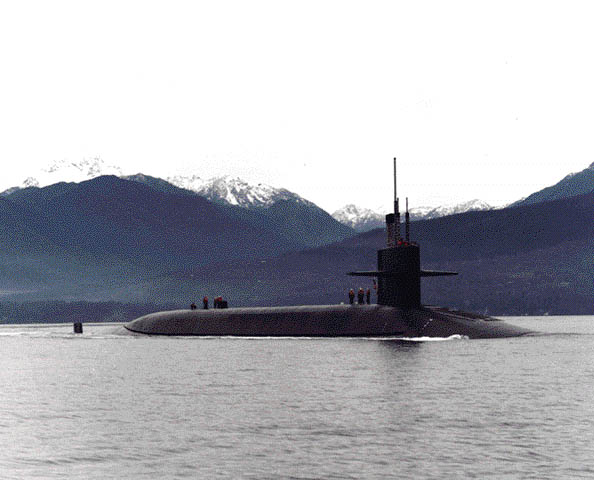
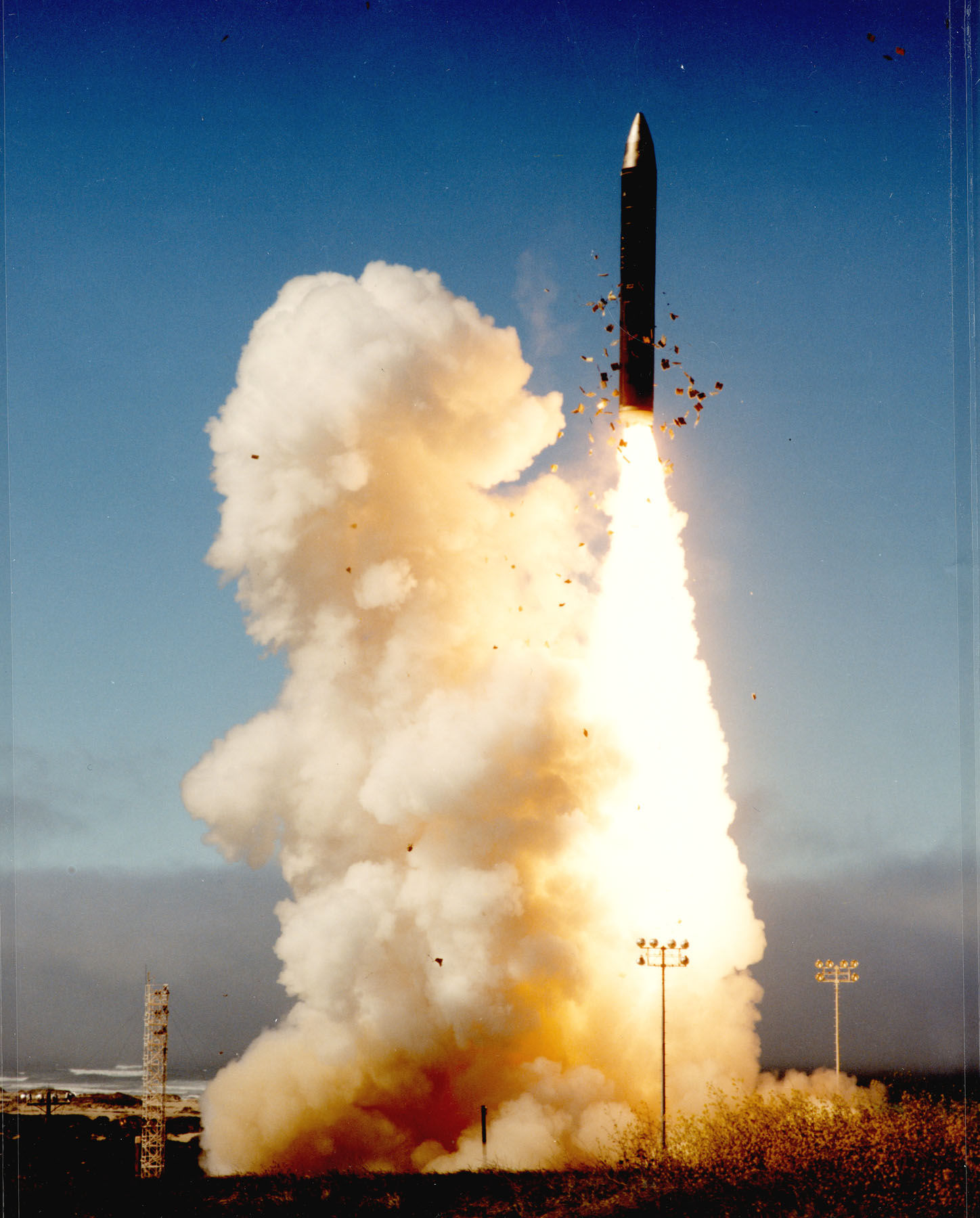
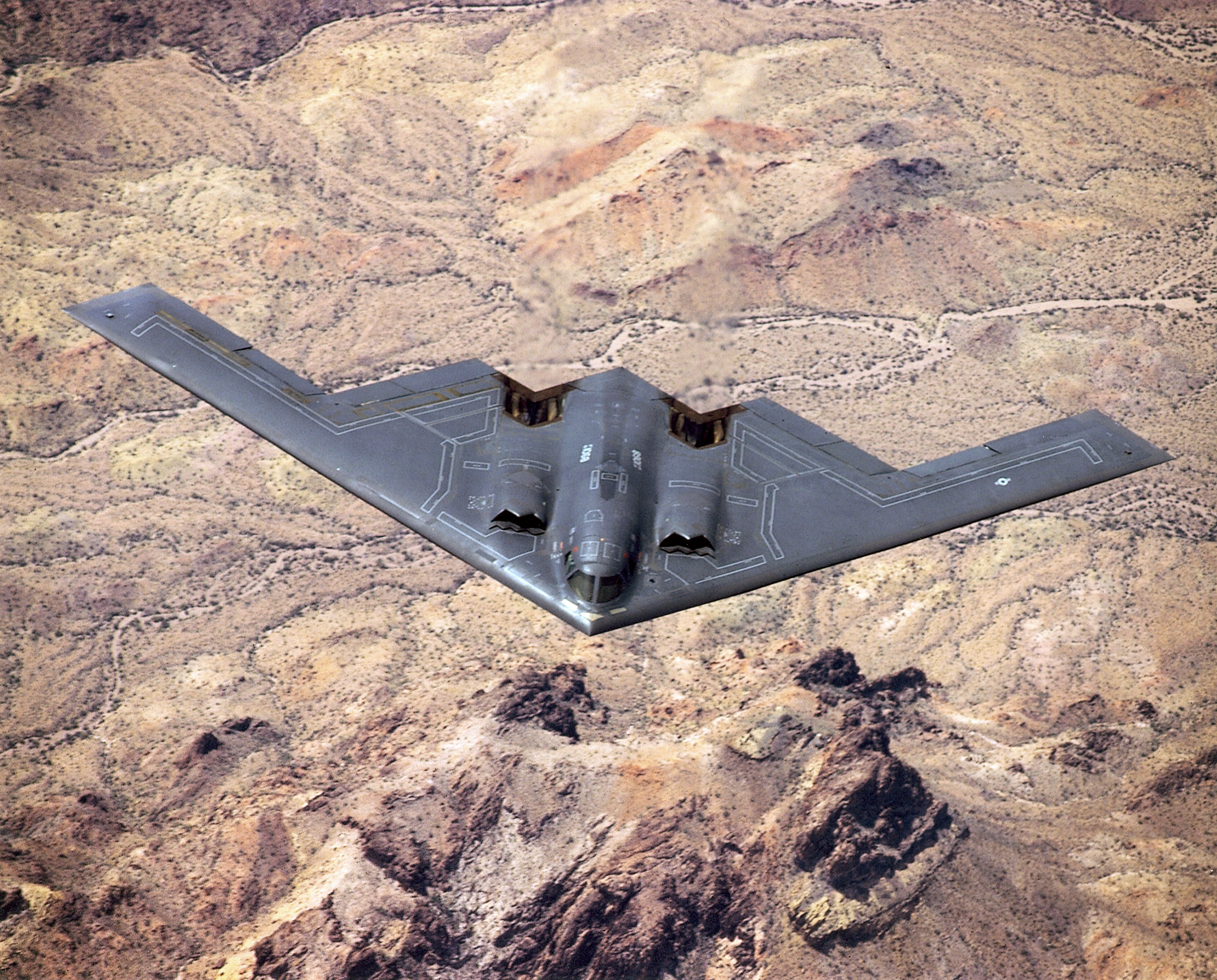
The elements of the post-Cold War US nuclear triad: an Ohio-class SSBN, an LGM-118 Peacekeeper ICBM, and a B-2 Spirit strategic bomber

The pinnacle of the 1990s in terms of global nuclear policy was the START Treaty in 1991 and the START II Treaty in 1993. These treaties called for the reduction of nuclear warheads and delivery systems within both the Soviet Union and the United States. Specifically, the U.S. was limited to 6,000 total warheads, 4,900 warheads on ballistic missiles, and 1,600 delivery vehicles. Consequentially, the United States began reducing both its warhead and delivery vehicle counts during this time. By the time they had completed the implementation of the START Treaty in 2001, the total warhead count was 6,196 and the total delivery system count was 1,064. These values continued to shrink, and by 2009 the United States reduced its warhead and delivery vehicles counts to 2,200 and 850 respectively.

Following the Cold War, the United States continued upgrading its various types of ICBMs. Minuteman II variants were all but eliminated and continued efforts were put toward Minuteman III and Peacekeeper variants. In 2001, the United States possessed 500 Minuteman III missiles (three warheads each) and 50 Peacekeeper missiles (ten warheads each).

Within its nuclear submarine fleet, the United States eliminated the usage of the "41 for Freedom" classes of ballistic missiles submarines in favor of the more versatile Ohio class. During the 1990s, the United States reached a total of 18 submarines within this class. In 2001, these 18 submarines were all deployable and could carry 24 Trident II missiles each (6 to 8 warheads on each missile).

The United States kept up to date with its strategic bomber leg of the triad following the Cold War as well. B-52G variants were phased out in favor of B-52H classes. In 2001, 94 B-52H bombers, each capable of carrying 20 cruise missiles, were active along with 21 B-2 Spirit bombers each capable of carrying 16 bombs (the B-2s began to join the fleet in 1993). B-1 Lancer bombers were phased out of the triad and reoriented for different missions in an effort to honor the delivery systems limitations set by the START Treaties.

==== Modern nuclear triad (2010–present) ====
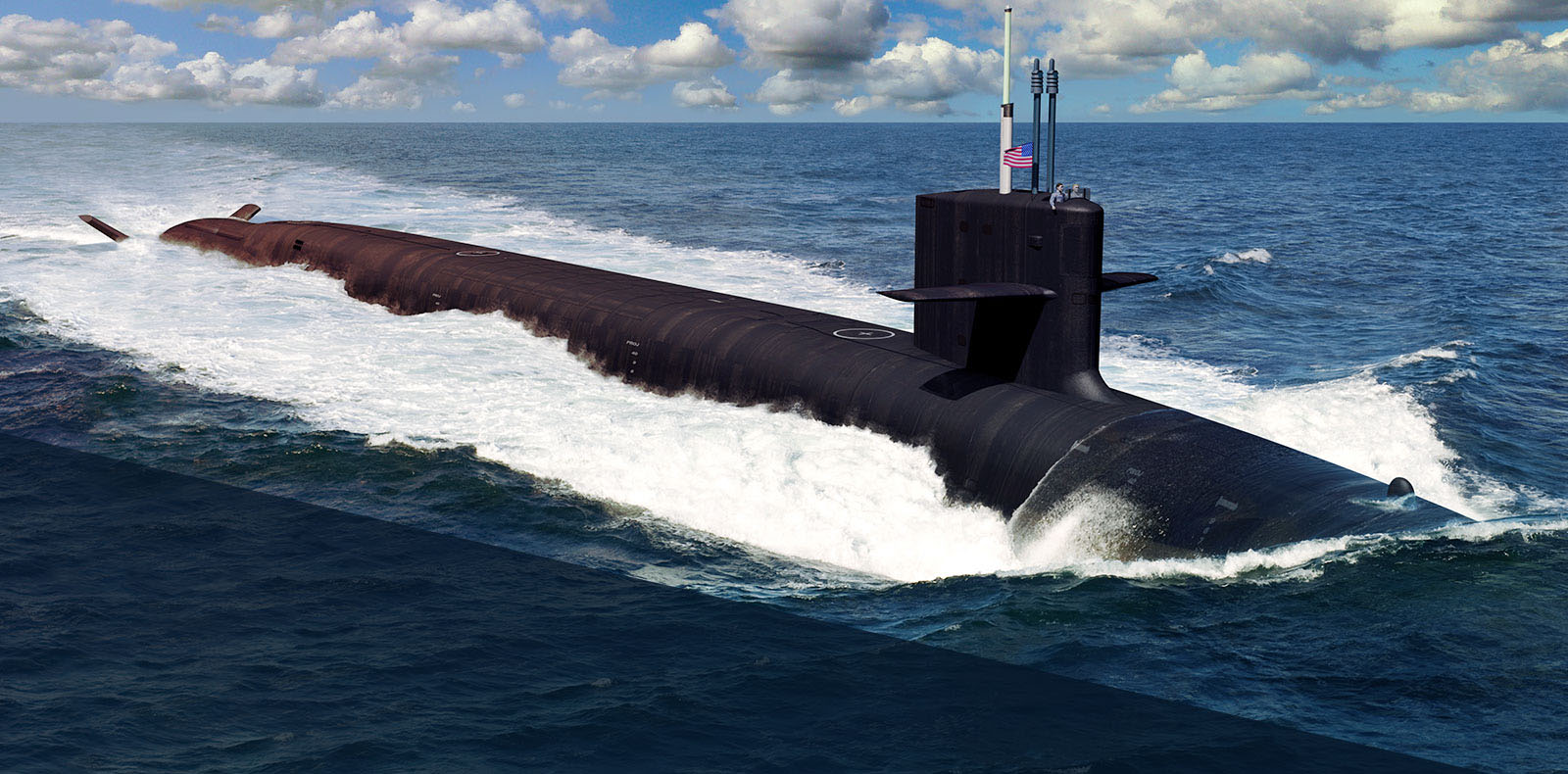
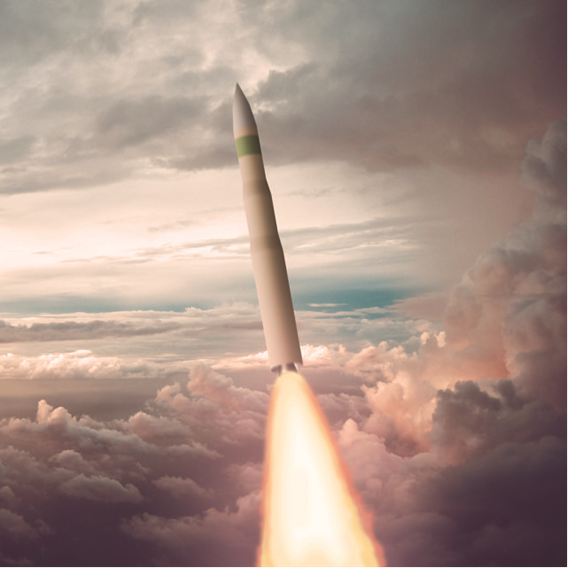
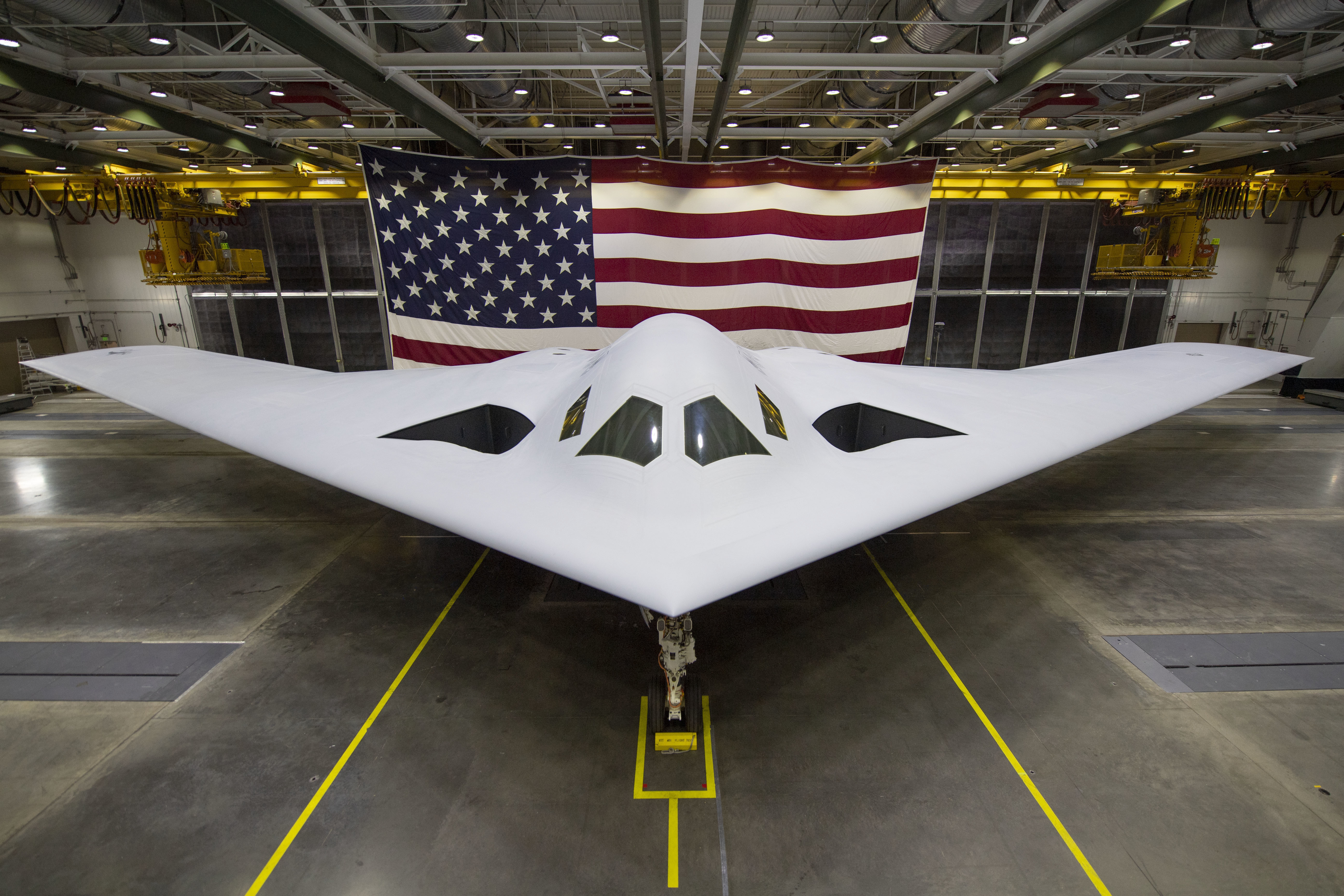
The elements of the future US nuclear triad: an Columbia-class SSBN, an LGM-35 Sentinel ICBM, and a B-21 Raider strategic bomber

The Obama Administration made clear in the 2010 Nuclear Posture Review (NPR) that the United States will retain a nuclear triad for the foreseeable future. Each leg was still viewed as necessary because of how they strengthened each other's weaknesses and gave the United States plenty of options for a nuclear strike should one or multiple legs go down. Following the New START Treaty set into place in 2010, the United States continued reducing its numbers of warheads and delivery systems with a focus on modernizing and updating its most effective platforms. The United States has released a plan to complete its downsizing efforts in 2018, reducing its 2010 numbers of 880 delivery vehicles and 2,152 warheads to 800 delivery vehicles and 1,550 warheads. In their release of the 2017 NPR, the Trump Administration made clear that the United States supports global nuclear weapons elimination. President Donald Trump also stated his intent to keep the US safe, as well as allies and partners. Until a time where nuclear weapons are no longer needed, the Trump Administration has also stated its intent to maintain a "modern, flexible, and resilient" nuclear armada. Since the height of the Cold War, the US's nuclear armada has been reduced by over 85 percent. The Trump Administration acknowledges it faces a "more diverse and advanced nuclear-threat environment than ever before."

It is estimated that the US currently has around 475 B-61 and B-83 bombs. The B61-7 is carried by the B-2, whereas the B61-3, 4, and 10 are lighter and can be carried by the F-16, F-35, and other light aircraft. These smaller bombs also yield smaller payloads due to their decreased size. The B61-11 is a more hardened bomb that can be used to destroy hardened targets such as bunkers, however it is unlikely that it can penetrate steel or concrete. The B83 is currently the largest bomb in the US arsenal. The US plans to retire it by the year 2025 after the new B61 LEP is completed.

The United States continues to operate its Minuteman III ICBMs (three warheads each) from underground hardened silos under the command of U.S. Air Force Global Strike Command. The Peacekeeper variants were eliminated to allow for the United States to honor the reduction requirements set forth by the New START Treaty. By February 2015, the United States Air Force had deactivated all missiles of this type and filled the silos containing them with gravel. The U.S. Minuteman III ICBMs are spread between three Air Force bases which are Francis E. Warren Air Force Base in Wyoming, Malmstrom Air Force Base in Montana, and Minot Air Force Base in North Dakota with each of these bases in possession of 150 missiles. Multiple programs have been put into place and are currently in place to work on up-keeping and modernizing the United States ICBM force including the Propulsion Replacement Program, Guidance Replacement Program, Propulsion System Rocket Engine Program, Safety Enhanced Reentry Vehicle (SERV), Solid Rocket Motor Warm Line Program, Rapid Execution and Combat Targeting (REACT) Service Life Extension Program, and Fuse Replacement Programs. The Air Force plans to keep the Minuteman III program viable and updated through 2030 and is in the process of developing a potential replacement in the form of the Ground Based Strategic Deterrent (GBSD) through various companies such as Northrop Grumman and Lockheed Martin.

The ballistic missile submarine leg of the United States' nuclear triad is still robust. Currently, the SSBN fleet consists of 14 Ohio-class submarines each capable of carrying 24 Trident II missiles. These ballistic missile submarines are based out of Kings Bay, Georgia, and Bangor, Washington. The New START Treaty has led the United States to reduce the number of missiles carried on each submarine from 24 to 20 and these reductions have been reached in 2018. In the early 2000s, the United States possessed 18 Ohio-class submarines. Following START Treaty protocol, the United States enacted various programs to reach the treaty's requirements. The Backfit Program was utilized to eliminate the submarines that still carried Trident I missiles leaving the United States with Ohio-class submarines that only carried Trident II missiles. This reduction led to the conversion of four SSBNs to SSGNs. SSGNs are guided missile submarines which carry conventional Tomahawk cruise missiles. The United States plans to begin retiring the Ohio-class submarines in 2027; a replacement for the Ohio class, the Columbia-class submarine, is currently being developed. It was first scheduled to enter service in 2031. As of 2024, construction is reported to be anywhere from 12 to 36 months behind schedule.

The strategic bomber program for the United States still remains viable as well. B-2 and B-52H bombers still make up the entirety of the long range bomber force designed to deliver a nuclear payload. The Rockwell B-1 Lancer is also used for long range bombing missions. However, in 1997, it was modified to carry only conventional payloads. The B-1 Lancer is no longer used to deliver nuclear payloads. Currently, 76 B-52H bombers are maintained at bases in Barksdale Air Force Base in Louisiana, and Minot Air Force Base in North Dakota. Along with these, 20 B-2 bombers are in service at Whiteman Air Force Base in Missouri. The United States Air Force is in the process of integrating a new long range bomber, the B-21 Raider, into service. This aircraft is scheduled to begin service in 2025. The B-21 is expected to have increased range and lower cost, though the details are classified. In 1997, the average cost of a B-2 was $737 million. The projected average cost for the B-21 Raider is $550 million per plane.

Long-Range Standoff, or LRSO weapons are another active option available to the US. Air-Launched cruise missiles (ALCM) and Advanced Cruise Missiles (ACM) are the missiles currently maintained by the Air Force. Both are carried via the B-52 bomber. The ACM's most current design gives it higher stealth capabilities than the ALCM. In 2006, the US had 1,142 ALCMs and 394 ACMs. Since then, the number of ALC missiles has been reduced to 528. By 2030, the Air Force plans to phase out the ALCM and replace them with the long range standoff (LRSO) cruise missile.

United States Strategic Command is responsible for strategic nuclear deterrence, global strike, and operating the Defense Department's Global Information Grid.

By 2024 the National Security Council had prepared an updated nuclear strategy.

=== Pakistan ===
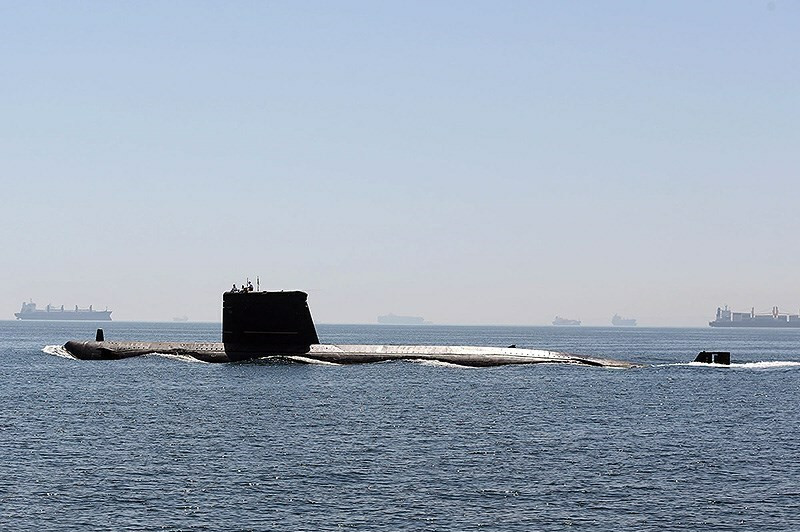
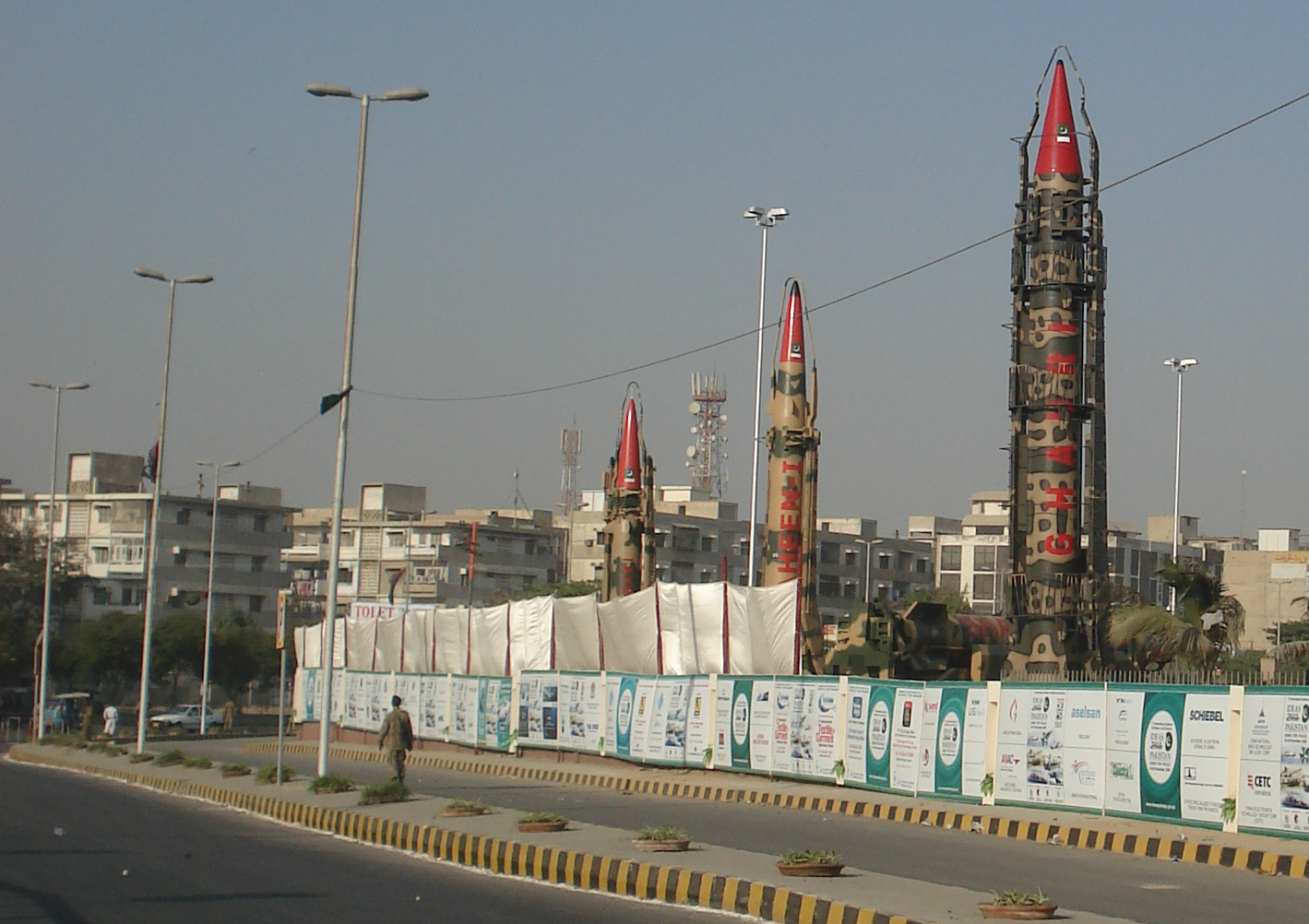
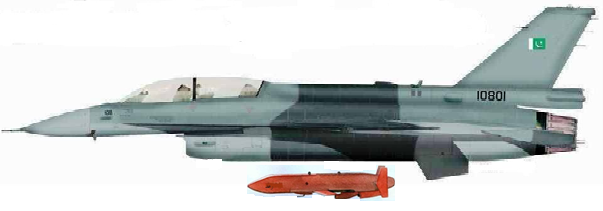
Launch platforms and elements of the Pakistan's nuclear 'triad' – Agosta submarine, land-based TEL system, and a Ra'ad ALCM on F-16B Falcon (artist sketch).

Pakistan is one of the eight declared nuclear weapons states in the world, with the capability to launch nuclear weapons from land, air, and sea platforms. While it possesses a diversified nuclear arsenal, Pakistani war strategists took a different approach than India and China by developing tactically nuclear capable submarine-launched cruise missiles (SLCMs) on their air-independent propulsion submarines instead.

The Shaheen-III is a medium-range ballistic missile (MRBM) with a range of up to 2,750–3,000 km (1,710–1,860 mi) enhancing Pakistan's ground-based deterrence capabilities by enabling it to target distant adversaries. The Ababeel missile is equipped with multiple independently targetable reentry vehicles (MIRVs), allowing Pakistan to target multiple locations simultaneously, improving the survivability of its nuclear forces; however as of 2026, no Ababeel missiles have been operationally deployed.

The Ra'ad and Ra'ad II are an air-launched cruise missile (ALCM) with a range of 350–700 km (220–430 mi), capable of carrying a nuclear warhead. It can be deployed from several Pakistan air force fighter aircraft, including the F-16A/B Vipers, JF-17 Thunder, and Mirage III Rose. These aircraft are part of Pakistan's Air Force Strategic Command, which oversees the nuclear strike capabilities and target selections for the Pakistani military.

The Babur-III, a submarine-launched cruise missile (SLCM) with a range of 450 km (280 mi), is Pakistan’s primary sea-based nuclear delivery system. It provides Pakistan with a second-strike capability, which is essential for ensuring a credible deterrent, and according to the Pakistani military, a SLCM-nuclear variant of Babur has provided Pakistan a much desired and long-sought after "credible sea-based second-strike capability, augmenting existing strategic deterrence."

== Partial triad powers ==
=== France ===
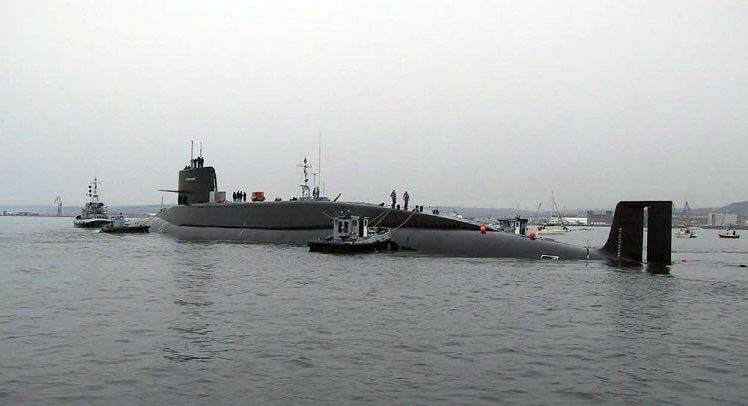
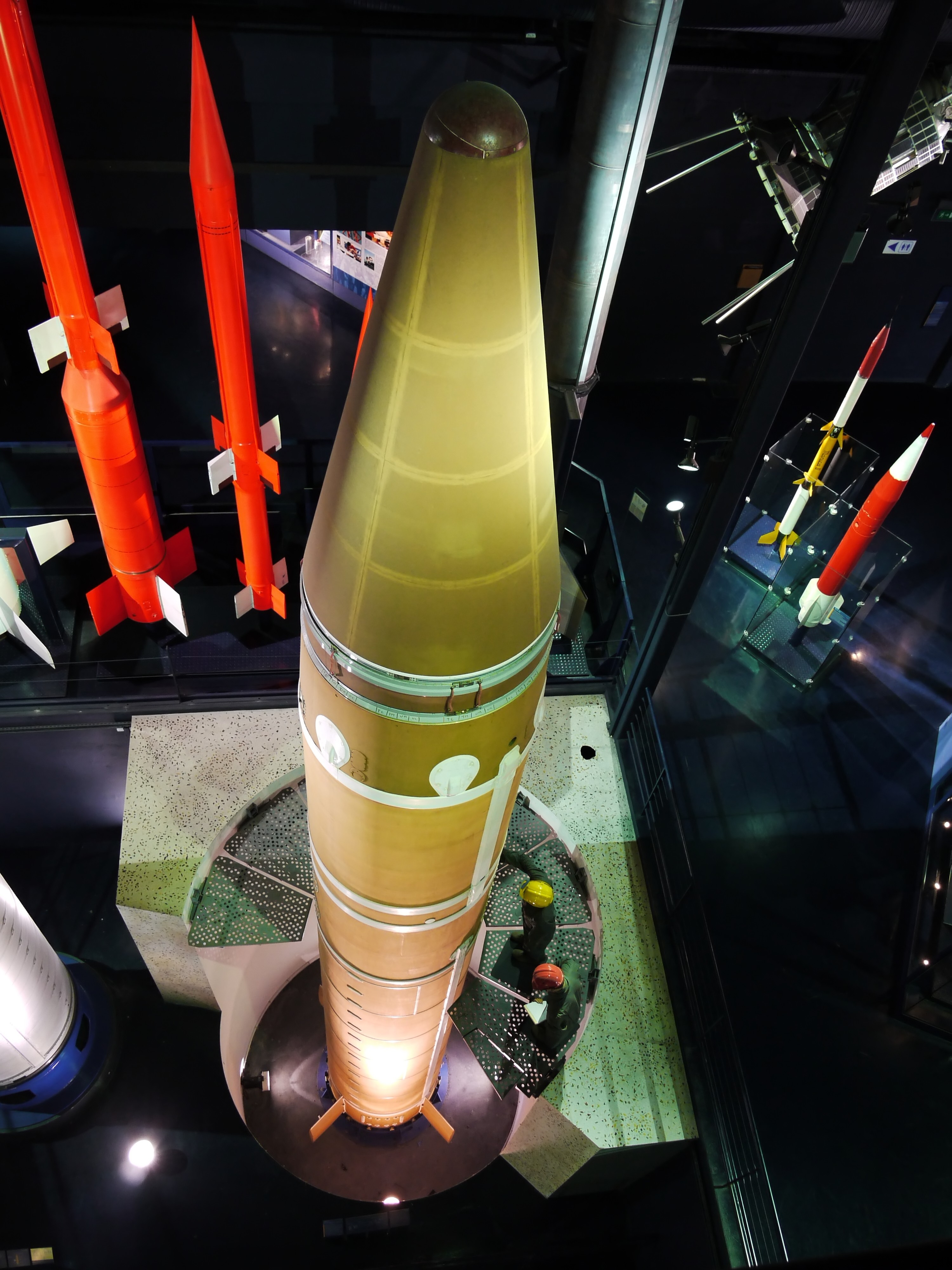
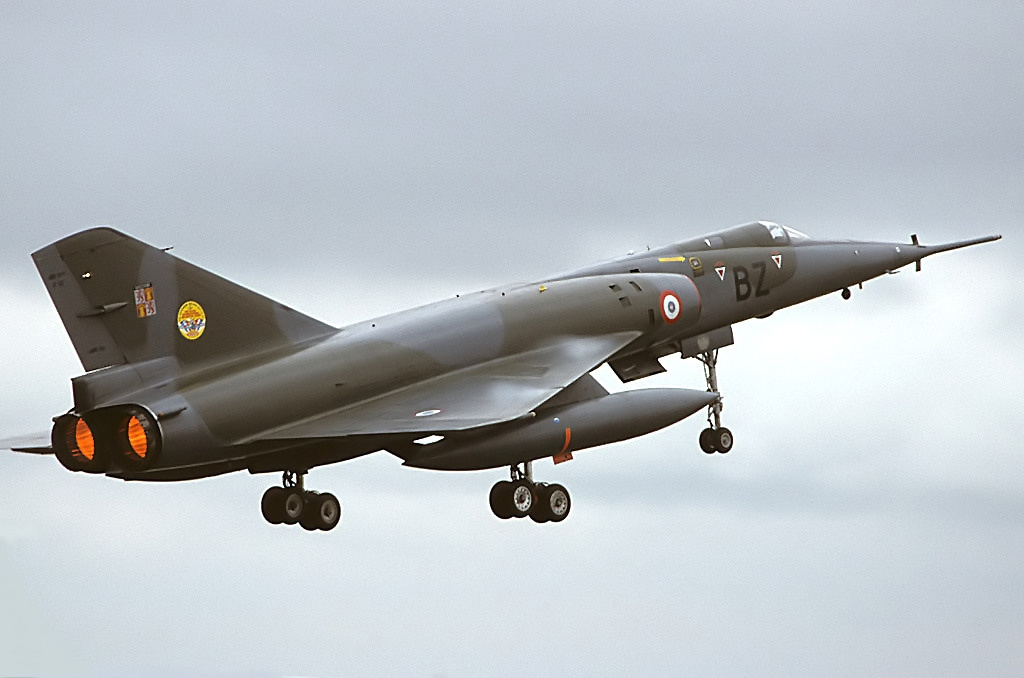
The elements of the French nuclear triad in the 1970s – FS Redoutable SSBN, an S3 IRBM, and a Dassault Mirage IV bomber

During the Cold War, France obtained ballistic missile submarines, land-based missiles, and nuclear-armed bombers. France was the third country to maintain a nuclear triad. In February 1960, France performed its first nuclear weapons test codenamed "Gerboise Bleue", meaning Blue Jerboa.

In 1955, the country started Project Coelacanth, the naval nuclear propulsion program. Their first attempt to build a nuclear ballistic missile submarine, Q.244, failed and was cancelled in 1959. The development of the land based reactor, PAT 1, allowed for Q.252 to be successful. The development of Q.252 led to the submarine Redoutable. The French produced the Mer-Sol Balistique Strategique, or M1 MSBS, a "submarine-launched ballistic missile". Between 1971 and 1980, France finished their first generation of nuclear ballistic missile submarines, which included all five submarines in Redoutable and the one Inflexible submarine. Of the five submarines in the Redoutable class, only one submarine contained an M-2 missile, the Foudroyant; The M-1 missile was put on the Redoutable and Terrible; two ships contained both M-2 missiles and M-20 missiles. The Inflexible contained M4 missiles. At this time, The Force Océanique Stratégique, the country's submarine fleet, contained 87 percent of the country's entire nuclear weaponry. Between 1986 and 2010, the country began work on their second generation of nuclear ballistic missile submarines, which included the Triomphant, the Téméraire, the Vigilant, and the Terrible. The Triumphant class of ships contained the M45 intermediate-range missile. The Terrible submarine contained the M51 missile.

S2 MRBMs and S3 IRBMs were operated on standby alert in silos on the Plateau d'Albion in the Vaucluse region from 1971 to 1996.

France operated a small fleet of Dassault Mirage IV supersonic strategic bombers from 1964 to 1996.

==== Modern capabilities ====
Since the Cold War, France has scaled down their weapons program; the budget for nuclear forces has been reduced from 40 percent to 20 percent; they stopped work on ground-launched ballistic missiles; nuclear testing sites have shut down; and their total ballistic missile submarine arsenal has been lowered from five to four.

While France has drastically reduced its nuclear arsenal, it currently maintains approximately 300 nuclear weapons. France deploys four Le Triomphant-class nuclear-powered ballistic missile submarines (SSBN) on the Atlantic Coast. Out of the four, one is deployed at all times and the other three are on standby at all times. France is in the process of upgrading its current SLBMs to a newer model. The most recent addition to the French submarine fleet came in September 2010 in the form of Le Terrible, which is equipped with the newer model of SLBMs. France plans to modernize the rest of its submarine fleet by 2020.

As far as air-capabilities are concerned, France maintains four separate fighter squadrons meant to act as a deterrence against foreign threats. There are 23 Mirage 2000N aircraft and 20 Rafale aircraft equipped with ASMP-air-launched cruise missiles (ALCM). The Charles de Gaulle aircraft carrier also maintains approximately 24 Rafale M aircraft. The Rafale M aircraft, as well as the Mirage 2000N K3 aircraft, is equipped with an upgraded ASMP-A air-launched cruise missile with a range of 500 kilometers. In February 2015, Francois Hollande, the President of France at the time, declared that "France possesses 54 ASMP-A missiles", confirming their exact number of missiles.

=== United Kingdom ===
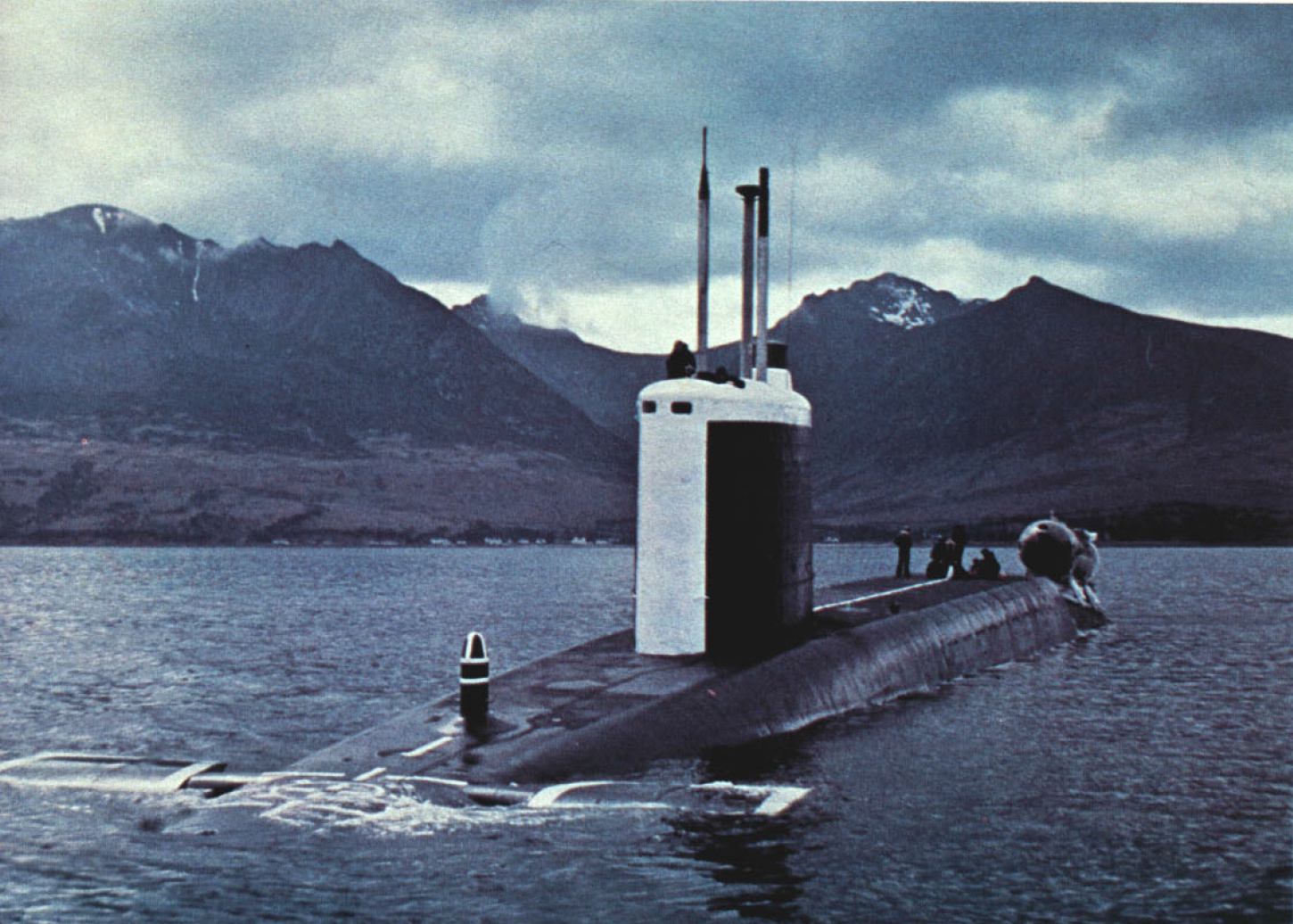
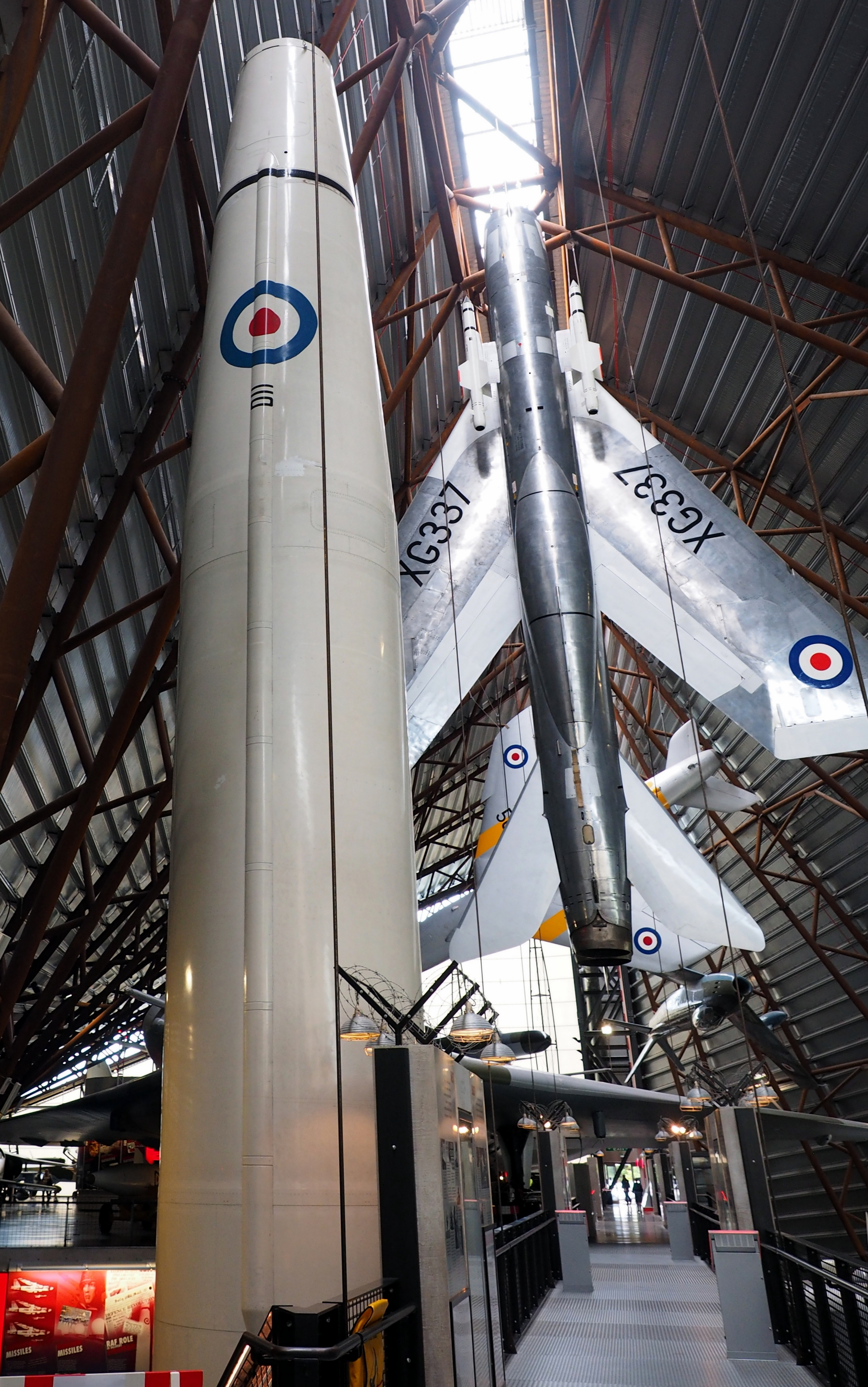
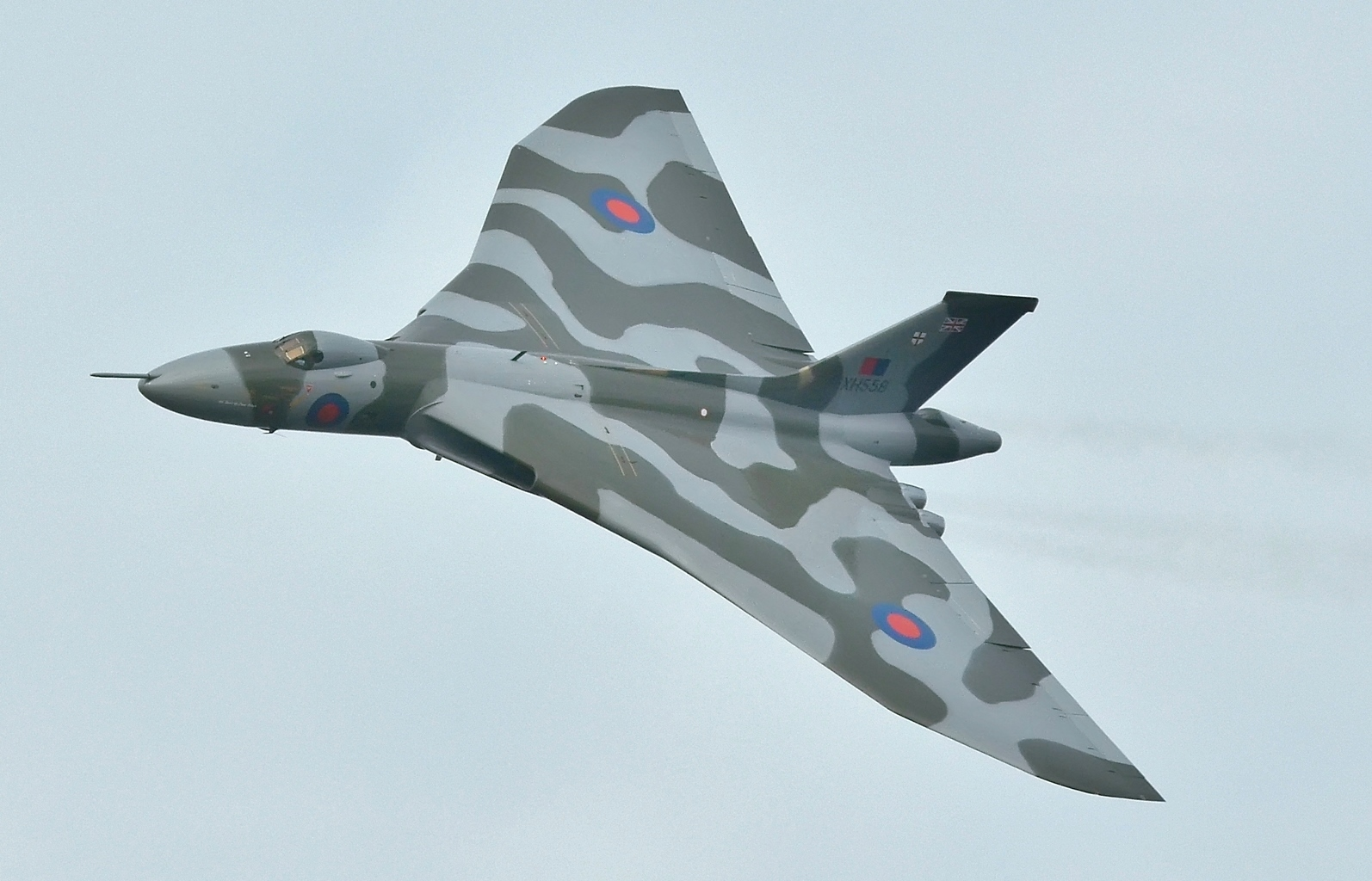
Elements of the British nuclear 'triad' – HMS Repulse SSBN, a PGM-17 Thor IRBM, and a Avro Vulcan bomber. The United Kingdom has never deployed its system as a complete triad at once.

The United Kingdom has operated the weapon systems that belonged to each triad element, but never simultaneously; therefore, the United Kingdom has never deployed its nuclear weapons as a complete triad. From 1955 till 1984, the British Royal Air Force operated nuclear-armed strategic aircraft, and a tactical aircraft until 1998.

In January 1959, the United States, under Project Emily, transferred the land-based Thor missiles from the United States Air Force to the British Army which were operated under a dual-key arrangement until August 1963. In 1969, the American designed Polaris program enabled the British Royal Navy to operate the submarine-launched ballistic missiles from their submarines as at-sea deterrent. If the American Thor missiles in British service had been retained until after Polaris became operational, then the United Kingdom would have briefly been a classified as a triad operator.

== Suspected triad powers ==
=== Israel ===
Israel neither confirms nor denies possession of nuclear weapons as national policy. However, the existence of a nuclear force is often hinted at blatantly. Evidence of an advanced weapons program including miniaturized as well as thermonuclear devices has been presented, especially with the extensive photographic evidence given by former Israeli nuclear weapons assembler Mordechai Vanunu in 1986. Since the 1960s, in Dimona, they have operated a nuclear reactor and an underground plutonium-separation plant. The US Defense Intelligence Agency concluded in 1999 that Israel had produced approximately 80 warheads, and projected that their stockpile would moderately increase by 2020. A 2015 estimate stated Israel had produced enough nuclear material for 115 to 190 warheads. Israel has been reported in a congressional testimony by the United States Department of Defense of having aircraft-delivered nuclear weapons as early as the mid-1960s, a demonstrated missile-based force also since the mid-1960s, an IRBM in the mid-1980s, an ICBM in the early 2000s and they are suspected of having second-strike capabilities with the arrival of the Dolphin-class submarine and Popeye Turbo submarine-launched cruise missile.

Israel maintains an inventory of nuclear-capable fighter aircraft such as the long-range F-15E Strike Eagle, F-16 and previously the F-4 Phantom, Dassault Mirage III, A-4 Skyhawk and the Nesher. Israel has a considerable and growing number of long-range tanker aircraft and aerial refueling capacity on its long-range fighter-bomber aircraft. This capacity was used in the 1985 long-range conventional strike against the PLO in Tunisia.

In a report by London's Sunday Times in June 2000, a missile test was reported. This being the only public evidence of a nuclear version of a single missile being tested off the coast of Sri Lanka. According to an official report that was submitted to the United States Congress in 2004, it may be that the Jericho 3 with a payload of 1,000 kg that allows Israel to have nuclear strike capabilities within the entire Middle East, Africa, Asia, Europe and almost all parts of North America, as well as within large parts of South America and Northern Oceania. Israel also has a regional reach with its Jericho 2 IRBM force.

While the Persian Gulf War was beginning in 1991, Germany agreed to subsidize the sale of two Dolphin-class diesel-powered submarines to Israel: there was a total of six submarines that were ordered and three have been delivered so far by the Germans. Jane's Defence Weekly reports that the Israeli Dolphin-class submarines are widely believed to be nuclear armed, offering Israel a second-strike capability with a demonstrated range of at least 1500 km in a 2002 test.

Israel is known to have nuclear-capable aircraft and land-base missiles. With the addition of nuclear-armed submarines this would mean that they now have a full triad of land-, air-, and sea-based nuclear delivery systems some of which would be invulnerable to a first strike by an enemy for the first time in their country's history. No other nation in the Middle East is known to be in possession of nuclear weapons, even though Iran, Iraq, Syria and Libya have started development programs that were never completed.

== Other nuclear delivery systems ==
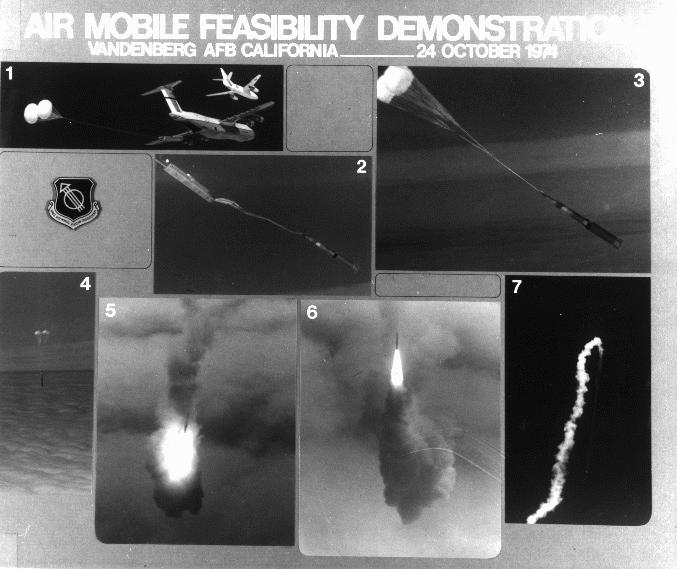
Air Mobile ICBM Feasibility Demonstration—24 October 1974

Nuclear delivery systems are not limited to those covered in the nuclear triad. Other methods of delivery could include orbital weapons, nuclear torpedoes and hypersonic glide vehicles. The Outer Space Treaty bans these types of weapons from outer space, stating that "the moon and other celestial bodies shall be used for peaceful purposes only". Although the treaty bans the use of nuclear weapons in space, technology that has already been deployed legally to space could be used in support of Earth-based nuclear weapons. GPS and other satellite navigation systems can be used for missile and bomb guidance, and reconnaissance satellites can be used to gather intelligence about enemies and targets. The existence of military assets in space increases the probability of a space-based conflict.

A nuclear torpedo is essentially a torpedo with a warhead attached to it. Russia is currently working on a nuclear-powered nuclear torpedo, which is referred to as the Poseidon (Status-6), according to the Pentagon. This thermonuclear warhead has the potential to hit any United States coast and radioactively contaminate the coastal regions.

== Redefining the nuclear triad ==
William Perry, who served as the 19th United States Secretary of Defense, has spoken for the removal of the land-based missiles from the nuclear triad. Perry believes that ICBMs are turning more into liabilities than assets. Perry says it would save "considerable cost" and would prevent an accidental nuclear war. Perry had experienced a false alarm for an incoming missile which later turned out to be a computer error. Perry's experience occurred 40 years ago, but similar false alarms have occurred since then, such as the 2018 Hawaii false missile alert. Perry says that a major problem with ICBMs is that they cannot be recalled once launched in the event of a false alarm.

American political scientist Matthew Kroenig has spoken against the removal of the land-based missiles leg of the nuclear triad. Kroenig writes that ICBMs offer defense from a pre-emptive nuclear strike. If the US had hundreds of ICBMs all over the US then this first attack would be a "near-insurmountable task. Kroenig writes that these ICBMs could save "millions of American lives". A study estimated that if the US were to keep its ICBMs, a Russian nuclear attack would result in 70 million US casualties, whereas if the US were to remove its ICBMs, that number increases to 125 million US casualties. Kroenig also writes that the risk of accidental launch is less than the benefit of keeping ICBMs. Also, Kroenig says "If ICBMs are truly expendable, then there is no reason to risk an accidental nuclear war just to avoid losing them. Kroenig also writes that ICBMs are the least costly leg of the triad. The annual operating cost of ICBMs is $1.4 billion for ICBMs, compared to $1.8 billion for bombers and $3.8 billion for SLBMs.

The U.S. Department of Defense defends the current triad, stating that "Without ICBMs, a conventional-only attack on the limited number of submarine and bomber bases could significantly degrade the U.S. nuclear arsenal without rising to the level of nuclear use. This significantly lowers the threshold for an attack against the U.S. homeland. Also, the Triad's diversity enables mitigation of risk if a particular leg of the Triad is degraded or unavailable."

=== In U. S. political culture ===
The nuclear triad gained more attention in the American public following a Republican Party presidential debate in December 2015. The moderator, Hugh Hewitt, had asked candidate Donald Trump a question about the triad. Trump, who would ultimately win the election, gave only a vague answer to the question. This suggested that he likely did not know what the nuclear triad was. Trump’s ignorance on the matter was mocked in the media, including by John Oliver in his show Last Week Tonight.

== See also ==
- Fail-deadly
- List of states with nuclear weapons
- Mutual assured destruction
- Nuclear arms race
