= French submarine Le Tonnant (S614) =

French ballistic missile submarine

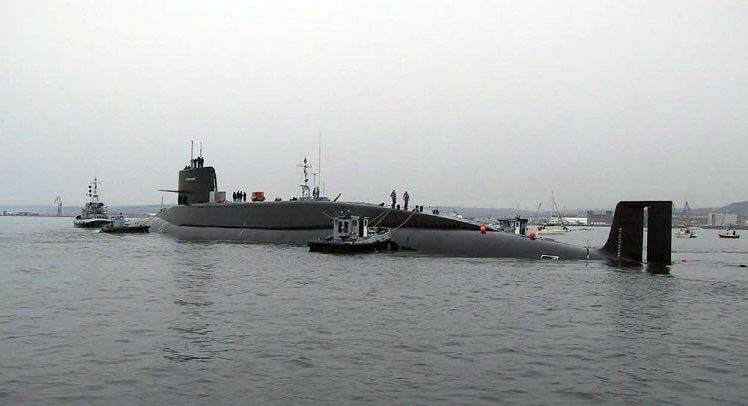
- Le Tonnant's sister ship Le Redoutable in 2005

History

France
- Name: Le Tonnant
- Builder: Cherbourg Naval Base
- Laid down: October 1974
- Launched: 17 September 1978
- Commissioned: 3 April 1980
- Decommissioned: 1997
- Fate: Scrapped, 2018

General characteristics
- Class & type: Redoutable-class ballistic missile submarine
- Displacement: Surfaced: 7,500 tons; Submerged: 9,000 tons
- Length: 128.0 m (419 ft 11 in)
- Beam: 10.6 m (34 ft 9 in)
- Draft: 10.0 m (32 ft 10 in)
- Installed power: 15,000 shp (11,000 kW)
- Propulsion: 1 × pressurized water-cooled nuclear reactor; 2 × steam turbines; 1 shaft; 1 × diesel engine (backup)
- Speed: Surfaced: 20 knots (37 km/h; 23 mph); Submerged: 25 knots (46 km/h; 29 mph)
- Range: Unlimited
- Complement: 135
- Armament: 16 × SLBM tubes; 4 × bow-mounted 550 mm (22 in) torpedo tubes; 18 × Torpedoes

Le Tonnant (S614) was a Redoutable-class ballistic missile submarine operated by the French Navy between 1980 and 1998. One of the first of her kind with the Navy, the boat conducted deterrence patrols as part of the French nuclear triad during the Cold War. Her duties were ultimately replaced by the Triomphant-class submarines, and the boat was dismantled in 2018.

== Development and design ==
During his premiership in the 1960s, Charles de Gaulle emphasized French autonomy from NATO and the Western Bloc, with a comprehensive military to maintain French sovereignty. A significant element of the doctrine was the development of a nuclear triad outside of American control, which became known as the Force de dissuasion. The seaborn leg of the triad required the domestic development of ballistic missile submarines, which became the main priority of the French Navy (Marine Nationale) for the next decade. The first series of French ballistic missile submarines were known as the Redoutable class.

The six Redoutable-class ballistic missile submarines measured 128.0 metres (419 ft 11 in) long overall, with a beam of 10.6 metres (34 ft 9 in) and a draught of 10.0 metres (32 ft 10 in). The boats displaced 7,500 tons surfaced and 9,000 tons submerged and carried a complement of 135. Propulsion was provided by a single-shaft nuclear power plant consisting of one pressurized water-cooled reactor, two steam turbines, two turbo-alternators, and one electric motor. This machinery produced 15,000 shaft horsepower (11,000 kW) and enabled a maximum speed of 20 knots (37 km/h; 23 mph) surfaced and 25 knots (46 km/h; 29 mph) submerged. Unlike earlier boats in the class, Le Tonnant was fitted with a metallic reactor core instead of an oxide core. An auxiliary diesel engine was carried onboard to get the submarines home if the reactor failed; the engine had a range of 5,000 kilometres (3,100 mi; 2,700 nmi) and an output of 2,670 brake horsepower (1,990 kW). Armament consisted of sixteen submarine-launched ballistic missile tubes and four bow-mounted 550 mm (22 in) torpedo tubes, with 18 torpedoes carried onboard. Sensors fitted included the DUVU-23 and DUUX-2 sonar systems, and the submarines could have a maximum depth of 300 metres (980 ft).

== Service history ==
Le Tonnant was the fifth of the class, and she was laid down at the Cherbourg Naval Base on October 1974, launched on 17 September 1977, and commissioned on 3 April 1980. She joined other members of the class and operated out of Île Longue in Brittany on patrols that lasted between two and three months. Two crews operated the boat in alternating patrols. The submarine was first deployed with the M2 ballistic missile, which was later replaced by the M20, and in turn the M4.

In the late 1990s, the Triomphant class was introduced to replace the Redoutable class on a one-to-one basis, although the last two Triomphant-class boats were cancelled. Le Tonnant was decommissioned in 1998 as the new boats began to enter service. The old submarine was laid up at Cherbourg and was dismantled between September 2018 and February 2020, the first of her class to have done so.
