= TN 70 =

The TN 70 is a French-built thermonuclear warhead which was used on submarine-launched ballistic missiles in Redoutable class ballistic missile submarines.

It has a yield of 150 kt and entered service in 1985 on M4-B ballistic missiles. It was replaced from 1987 by the TN 71 which were lighter.

There were 96 operational TN 70 warheads before its replacement in 1987 but none remaining by 1997, at which time it was withdrawn from service.

== See also ==
- force de frappe
- FOST
- nuclear tests by France
