= French submarine Le Triomphant =

Nuclear submarine in the French Navy

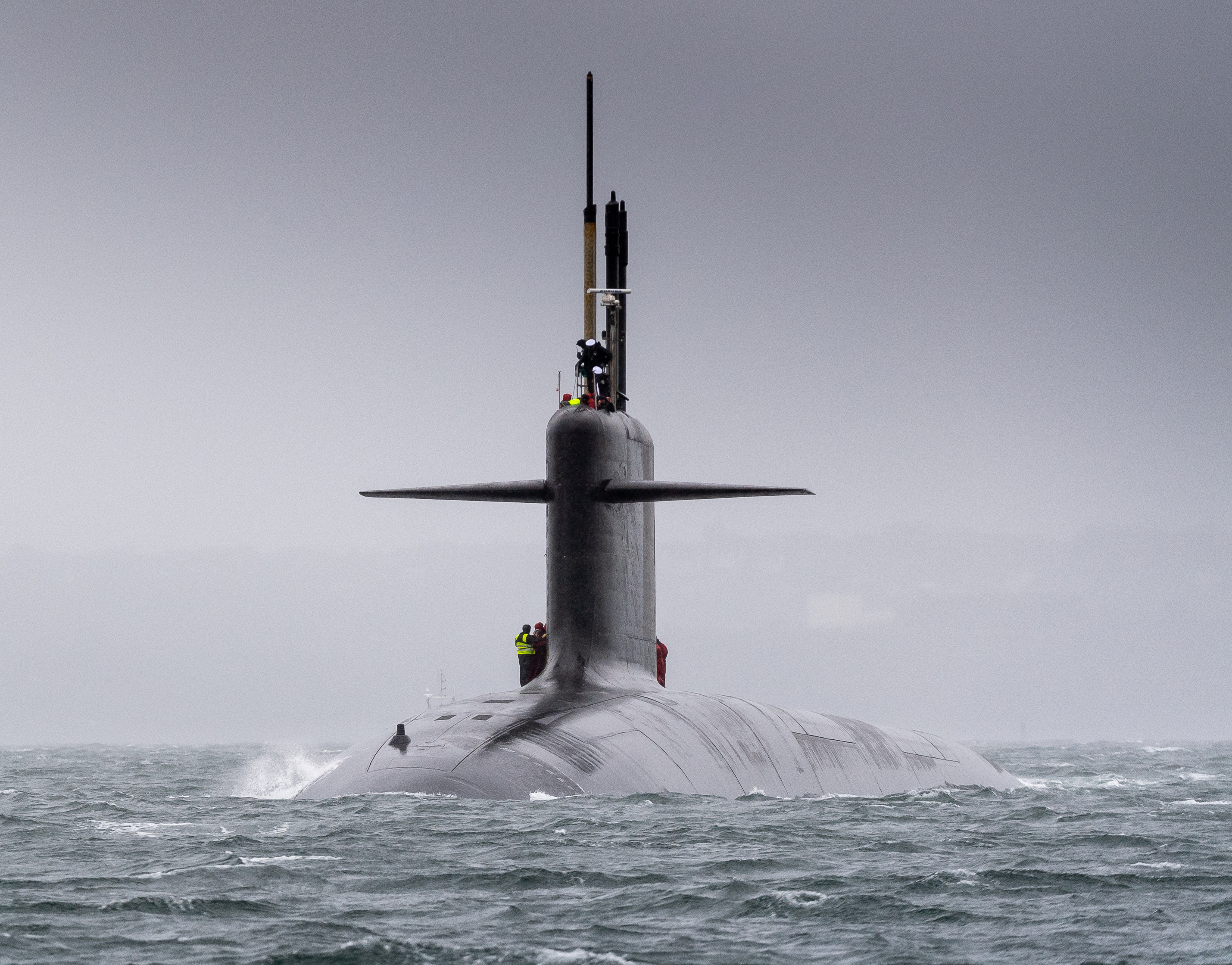
- Le Triomphant

History

France
- Name: Le Triomphant
- Namesake: "Triumphant"
- Cost: €4.282 billion (2010)
- Laid down: 9 June 1989
- Launched: 26 March 1994
- Commissioned: 21 March 1997
- Home port: Île Longue
- Identification: S616

General characteristics
- Class & type: Le Triomphant class submarine
- Displacement: 12,640 tonnes (surfaced); 14,335 t (submerged)
- Length: 138 m (453 ft)
- Beam: 12.50 m (41.0 ft)
- Draught: 10.60 m (34.8 ft)
- Propulsion: Pressurised water K15 nuclear reactor (150 MW (200,000 hp)), LEU 7%; turboreductor system; Pump-jet; 2 SEMT Pielstick diesels-alternators 8PA4V200 SM (700 kW (940 hp)) auxiliaries.; 30,500 kW (40,900 hp)
- Speed: over 25 knots (46 km/h; 29 mph)
- Range: Unlimited distance; 20–25 years
- Test depth: Over 400 m (1,300 ft)
- Complement: 110, including 15 officers
- Sensors & processing systems: Sonar DMUX 80; Sonar DUUX 5; Sonar DSUV 61B Very Low Frequency; Racal Decca radar (navigation); SCC : SET (Système d'exploitation Tactique) : tactical operational system
- Electronic warfare & decoys: ARUR 13
- Armament: Nuclear: 16 M45 or M51 missiles with six to ten TN 75 150 kt or TNO 100-300 kt thermonuclear warheads; Anti-submarine : 4 × 533 mm tubes for F17 torpedoes; Anti-surface : Exocet SM39

Le Triomphant (French pronunciation: [lə tʁijɔ̃fɑ̃]) is a strategic nuclear submarine of the French Navy; the submarine is the lead boat of her class commissioned in 1997 with the home port of Île Longue. The vessel carries sixteen strategic missiles part of the Force de dissuasion, whose launch can be authorized by the President of France.

== History ==
=== Construction and testing ===
The first metal of Le Triomphant was cut at DCN Cherbourg in October 1986, and the boat's engine was shipped to the boat from DCN Indret five years later. The reactor was built into the vessel in August 1991, with the fore and aft sections being welded on in January and April 1992 respectively. The boat was armed and given a commander in May 1992 and moved from the assembly site to the completion basin in July 1993. The boat's launching in March 1994 was followed by the first dive that June and the trip from DCN Cherbourg to lle Longue that July down the "free route" between Cherbourg and Brest, with a crew of 110 and engineers from DCN Cherbourg. On 4 January 1995, during testing, the boat reached maximum depth for the first time and made the first firing of a ballistic missile the following month. Photographs of the boat were exhibited to the Senate of France from 15 to 23 May 1995. In June, the boat set off back to Cherbourg for Post-Testing Upgrades (Remises A Niveau Après Essais or RANAE), then set off for a second set of trials, making 1,300 hours of test dives in total and a five-week trip. The boat then spent five weeks in maintenance at Cherbourg and during the main weapons tests took on 11 torpedo models, five trial torpedoes and one Exocet SM39 exercise. As a deterrent system, a salvo of 15 models was successfully launched and, in the last round of development, the boat functioned successfully as a missile platform.

=== Characteristics ===
Le Triomphant entered active service in March 1997. On 18 October 2001, the fleet support service notified the DCN that Triomphant was about to take the first period of Unavailability for Maintenance and Repairs (IPER or Indisponibilité pour Entretien et Réparations). The 150 million Euro contract was granted to DCN, with the IPER starting at Ile Longue on 2 April 2002, scheduled for 29 months in all. In this, the boat's first major refit, the missiles and the fuel elements of the nuclear boiler were disembarked. In August 2004 L'Humanité ran a piece with the headline "Pas si Triomphant que ça" reporting that Le Triomphant had suffered a nuclear leak from one of her nuclear warheads by the end of 1997 and from her reactor in 2004, though the FOST downplayed the incidents and stated no radiation had been released since the reactor had been non-operational at the time. Le Triomphant carried out a test flight of a M45 strategic missile on 1 February 2005 in the Atlantic.

Since 1972, patrols by Submarines forces are conducted 24/7 365/year, embarking each sixteen strategic missiles, which launching can only be authorized by the President of France, and which could destroy 96 targets with an equivalent effect of a hundred times the explosions of Hiroshima and Nagasaki.

=== Collision with HMS Vanguard ===
On the night between 3–4 February 2009, Vanguard collided with the French submarine Le Triomphant in the Atlantic Ocean.

On 6 February 2009, the French Ministry of Defence reported that Le Triomphant "collided with an immersed object (probably a container)" The UK Ministry of Defence initially would not comment that the incident took place. On 16 February 2009, the incident was confirmed by First Sea Lord Sir Jonathon Band, in response to a question at an unrelated event. Band said that the collision occurred at low speed, and that there had been no injuries. The French Ministry of Defence also stated that a collision "at a very low speed" had occurred, with no casualties. At the time of the collision, both vessels were submerged and moving "at very low speed" according to the UK Ministry of Defence. Both are equipped with active and passive sonar, although only the latter is used on an operational patrol.

Both nuclear-powered ballistic missile submarines sustained damage, but no injuries or radioactivity releases were reported. Vanguard received damage to the outer casing in the area of the missile compartment on the starboard (right) side, requiring repairs. Le Triomphant was said to have received damage to the active sonar dome under her bow, indicating that Le Triomphant ran into Vanguard from above and amidship. According to The Daily Telegraph, the cost of repairing the damage to both submarines was expected to amount to up to £50 million (equivalent to about £80M in 2025). Both vessels returned to home bases under their own power, Vanguard to Her Majesty's Naval Base Clyde in the Firth of Clyde on 14 February 2009, and Le Triomphant to Île Longue in Brittany, escorted by a frigate as a normal procedure.

The BBC speculated that though a collision might appear highly improbable considering the vastness of the areas in which SSBNs operate, the actual areas they use are in reality limited, and overlap. They have claimed that the use of these areas by submarines of the British, French and Russian navies has increased the risk of accidental collision. Several media outlets have referred to comments by retired Royal Navy Commodore Stephen Saunders, editor of Janes Fighting Ships, where he described the incident as "very serious" and said it was time for France and Britain to coordinate their submarine operations more actively, suggesting that the use of operating areas is not communicated between France, the UK and the United States or that communication procedures were not effective. "I would have thought it possible to at least arrange to be in different parts of the ocean without compromising operational security," said Saunders. "No doubt there are a number of technical issues to be investigated, but the root of the problem appears to be procedural." This position appears to be corroborated by Admiral Sandy Woodward, a former commander of the Royal Navy's submarine force. In a commentary article for The Independent newspaper, he said that whilst it is not known whether the UK and France exchange information now, it was not the case when he served as Flag Officer Submarines in 1984. He recalls that his French counterpart proposed that London and Paris share information on SSBN patrols, precisely to avoid an incident at sea, but no agreement was reached at the time on achieving that.

With the delayed acknowledgement of the accident, both the British and French ministries of defence were accused of attempting a cover-up of the collision. The delay in reporting the accident was also criticised in the international press. British MP Nick Harvey demanded an official inquiry into the issue. A government spokesman said that there "was no compromise to nuclear safety". Hervé Morin, France's Minister of Defence, said that they "face an extremely simple technological problem, which is that these submarines are not detectable".

== See also ==
- List of submarines of France
