= TN 71 =

French-built thermonuclear warhead

The TN 71 is a French-built thermonuclear warhead which was used on submarine-launched ballistic missiles in Redoutable class ballistic missile submarines.

It has a yield of 150 kt.

Entering service in 1985 on M4-B ballistic missiles, it was replaced at the end of October 1996 by the TN 75, which equips M45 missiles for France's Triomphant class of "new generation" ballistic missile submarines (SNLE-NG).

There were 288 operational TN 71 warheads before its replacement in 1996, and 96 in 2001, but none were remaining by 2004, at which time it was withdrawn from service.

== See also ==
- Force de frappe
- FOST
- List of nuclear tests#France
