= French submarine Redoutable (S611) =

Naval museum in Cherbourg-Octeville, France

Coordinates: 49°38′51.90″N 1°37′2.58″W

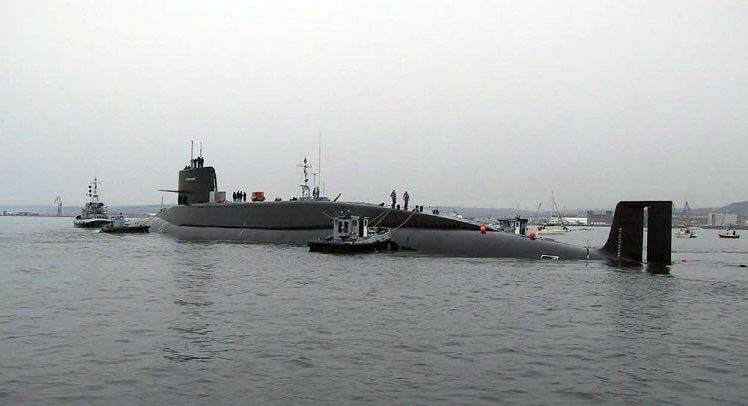

History

France
- Builder: Arsenal de Cherbourg (DCAN)
- Laid down: November 1964
- Launched: 29 March 1967
- Commissioned: 1 December 1971
- Decommissioned: 1 December 1991
- Stricken: December 1991
- Home port: Île Longue
- Identification: FBEP
- Status: Converted into museum ship

General characteristics
- Class & type: Redoutable-class submarine
- Displacement: 8,000 tons (submerged)
- Length: 128 metres (420 ft)
- Beam: 10.6 metres (35 ft)
- Draught: 10 metres (33 ft)
- Decks: 3
- Installed power: nuclear
- Propulsion: One GWC PAR K15 PWR, 16,000 shp, HEU <= 90%
- Speed: over 20 knots (37 km/h; 23 mph)
- Range: Essentially unlimited
- Complement: 15 officers; 120 sailors
- Sensors & processing systems: 1 DRUA 33; 1 DMUX 21; 1 DSUV 61B VLF; 1 DUUX 5; ARUR 12 radar detector
- Armament: 16 M20 MSBS (Mer-Sol Balistique Stratégique) nuclear missiles; four 550 mm torpedo tubes; F-17 and L-5 torpedoes; SM-39 Exocet

Le Redoutable (S 611) was the lead boat of her class of ballistic missile submarines in the French Marine nationale.

Commissioned on 1 December 1971, the boat was the first French SNLE (Sous-marin Nucléaire Lanceur d'Engins, "Device-Launching Nuclear Submarine"). The boat was initially fitted with 16 M1 MSBS (Mer-Sol Balistique Stratégique) submarine-launched ballistic missiles, delivering 450 kilotons nuclear warheads at 2,000 kilometres (1,200 mi). In 1974, the boat was refitted with the M2 missile, and later with the M20, each delivering a one-megatonne warhead at a range over 3,000 kilometres (1,900 mi). Le Redoutable ("formidable" or "fearsome" in French) was the only ship of the class not to be refitted with the M4 missile.

Le Redoutable had a 20-year duty history, with 51 patrols of 70 days each, totalling an estimated 90,000 hours of diving and 1.27 million kilometres (790,000 mi) of distance, the equivalent of travelling 32 times around the Earth.

The boat was decommissioned in 1991. In 2000, the boat was removed from the water and placed in a purpose-built 136 metres (446 ft) dry dock, and over two years was made into an exhibit. This was a monumental task, the biggest portion of which was removing the nuclear reactor and replacing the midsection with an empty steel tube. In 2002, the boat opened as a museum ship at the Cité de la Mer maritime museum in Cherbourg-Octeville, France, being now the largest submarine open to the public and the only nearly-complete ballistic missile submarine hull open to the public — although several museums display small portions, such as sails and/or parts of rudders from such submarines. Special dinner events for organizations aboard this boat's interior spaces are offered by Cité de la Mer.

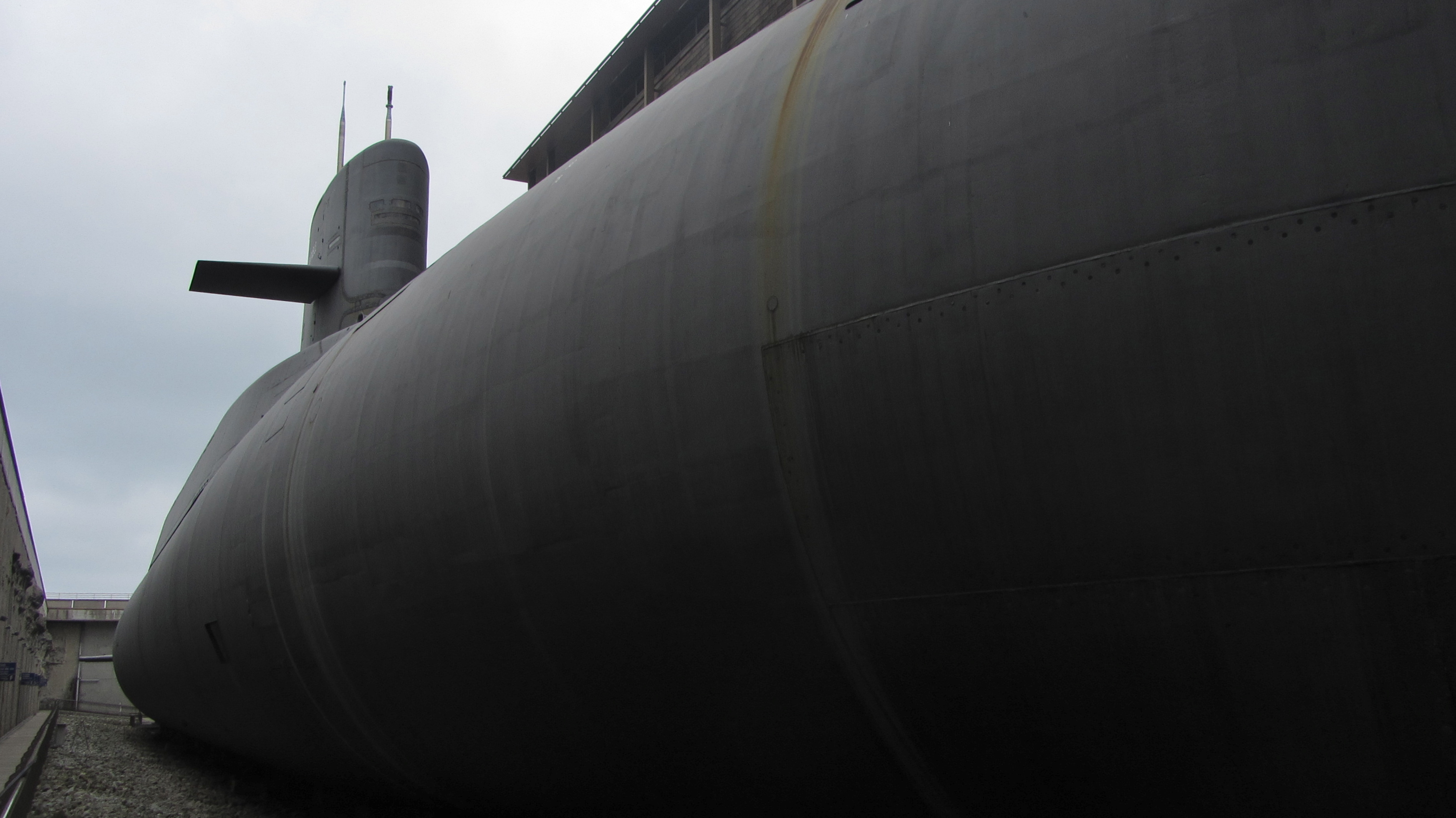
Le Redoutable at the Cité de la Mer

== See also ==
- List of submarines of France
  - 1500 ton-class submarines
- List of submarine museums
- List of submarine classes
