= French submarine Le Téméraire =

Nuclear submarine in the French Navy

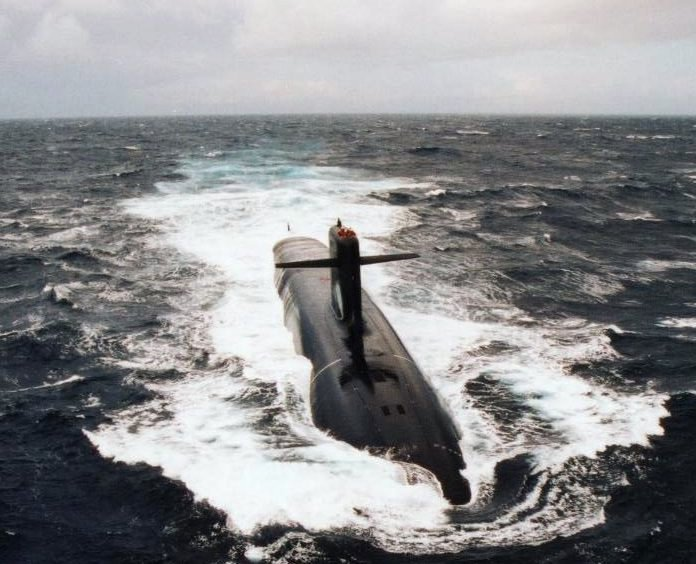
- Le Téméraire (S 617)

History

France
- Name: Le Téméraire
- Namesake: "Daring"
- Cost: €4.282 billion (2010)
- Laid down: 18 December 1993
- Launched: 21 January 1998
- Commissioned: 23 December 1999
- Home port: Île Longue
- Identification: S617

General characteristics
- Class & type: Triomphant-class submarine
- Displacement: 12 640 tonnes (surfaced); 14 335 t (submerged)
- Length: 138 m (453 ft)
- Beam: 12.50 m (41.0 ft)
- Draught: 10.60 m (34.8 ft)
- Propulsion: Pressurised water K15 nuclear reactor (150 MW (200,000 hp)), LEU 7%; turboreductor system; Pump-jet; 2 SEMT Pielstick diesels-alternators 8PA4V200 SM (700 kW (940 hp)) auxiliaries.; 30,500 kW (40,900 hp)
- Speed: over 25 knots (46 km/h; 29 mph)
- Range: Unlimited distance; 20–25 years
- Test depth: Over 400 m (1,300 ft)
- Complement: 15 officers; 96 men
- Sensors & processing systems: Sonar DMUX 80; Sonar DUUX 5; Sonar DSUV 61B Very Low Frequency; Racal Decca radar (navigation); SCC : SET (Système d'exploitation Tactique) : tactical operational system
- Electronic warfare & decoys: ARUR 13
- Armament: Nuclear: 16 M45 or M51 missiles with six to ten TN 75 150 kt or TNO 100-300 kt thermonuclear warheads; Anti-submarine : 4 × 533 mm (21 in) tubes for F17 torpedoes; Anti-surface : Exocet SM39

Le Téméraire (French pronunciation: [lə temeʁɛʁ]) is a Triomphant-class ballistic missile submarine of the French Navy, launched in January 1998, and commissioned in December 1999, six months behind schedule. The boat had, in May 1999, successfully test launched an M45 submarine-launched ballistic missile.

== In fiction ==
Le Téméraire is featured along with the French SSN Améthyste in the 2019 The Wolf's Call film.

== See also ==
- List of submarines of France
