= L'Invincible-class submarine =

French Navy ballistic missile submarine class

L'Invincible class
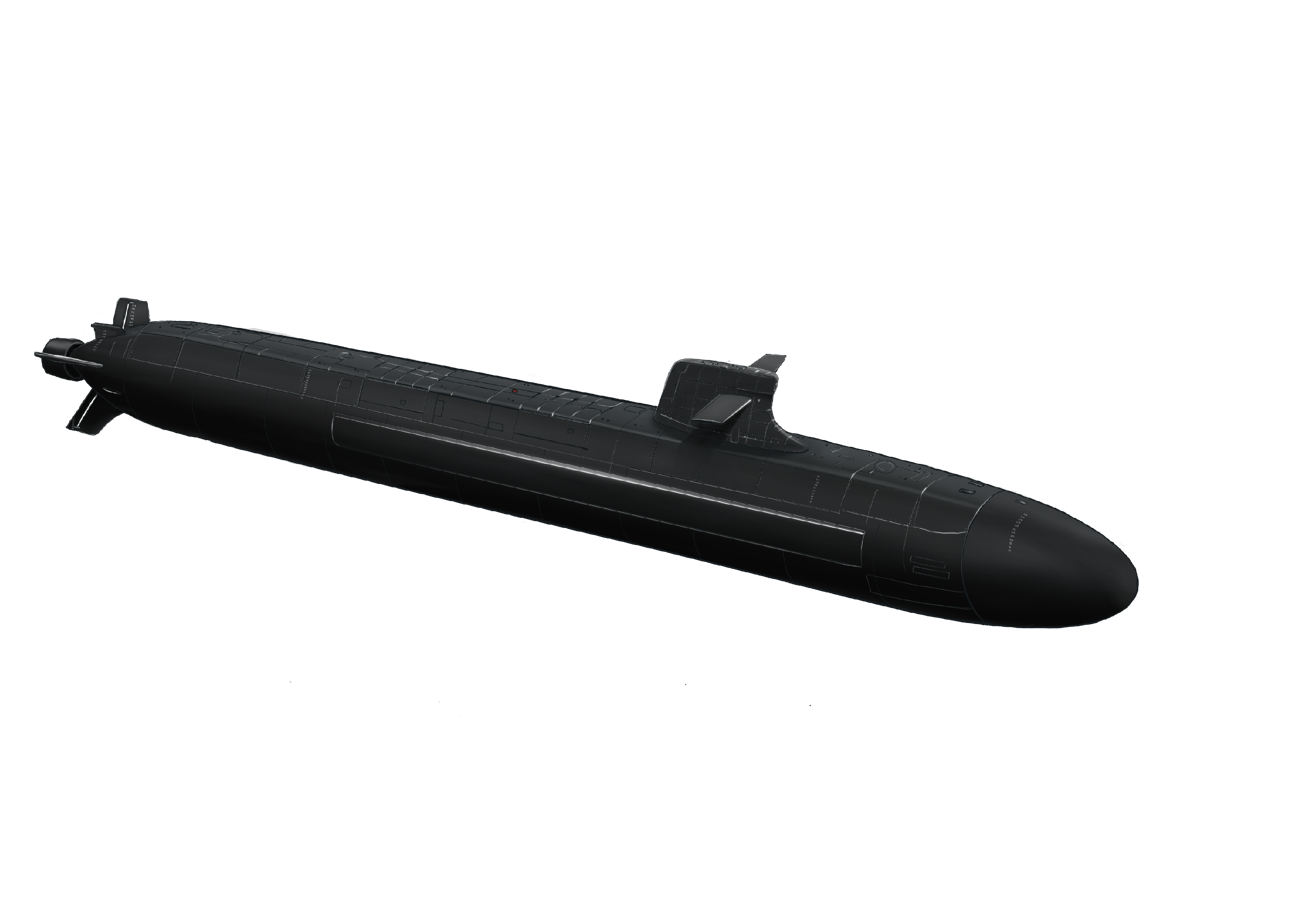
- L'Invincible class illustration

Class overview
- Builders: Naval Group
- Operators: French Navy
- Preceded by: Le Triomphant class
- Built: From 2024
- In commission: Projected 2036
- Planned: 4
- Building: 1

History
- Status: Under construction

General characteristics
- Type: Ballistic missile submarine
- Displacement: 15,000 tons (submerged)
- Length: ~150 m (490 ft)
- Installed power: 220 MW (300,000 hp)
- Propulsion: K22 pressurized water reactor
- Range: Unlimited distance; 20–25 years
- Armament: Nuclear: 16 M51 missiles with six to ten TNO 100 kt thermonuclear warheads; 533 mm (21 in) torpedo tubes for F21 torpedoes and anti-ship missiles

The L'Invincible class submarine (formerly Sous-Marin Nucléaire Lanceur d'Engins de Troisieme Génération; SNLE 3G) ("third generation nuclear ballistic missile submarine") is a class of submarines under development for the French Navy's nuclear deterrent, part of the Force de dissuasion. It is being designed as a replacement for the current Le Triomphant class beginning around 2035, and could remain in service to as late as 2090. Steel was cut on the first vessel in the class in March 2024. On 2 March 2026 President Emmanuel Macron announced that the lead vessel would be named L'Invincible and was planned to be in commission in 2036.

== Planning ==
The current French ballistic missile submarines, the Le Triomphant class came into service from 1997 and are due to be withdrawn around 2035. Initial studies for a replacement class began in 2017. The start of the general detailed design phase for the vessels was announced on 18 February 2021 by Minister of the Armed Forces Florence Parly.

The project is led by the French defence procurement agency, the Direction générale de l'armement, with support from the French Alternative Energies and Atomic Energy Commission. The vessels are expected to be built by Naval Group in Cherbourg and TechnicAtome. The supply chain will involve 200 companies and 3,000 people. The design phase is expected to require 15 million man hours of effort and the construction of each submarine 20 million man-hours. A memorandum of understanding has been signed with Thales Group to provide a full sonar suite for the new class which will include flank and bow-mounted sonar and a towed array. The suite will require the use of artificial intelligence to manage the increased data outputs.

The cost of the project has been estimated by commentators at around €40 billion, though the Ministry for the Armed Forces has said it is too early to provide an estimate. The design phase is expected to last around five years.

== Design and operation ==
The plan is to construct four submarines, the same number as the Le Triomphant class. This is intended to ensure that one vessel can be kept permanently at sea and a second at sea or on short notice to depart. The remaining two vessels would be in maintenance. On routine deployments, each vessel is expected to spend around three months at sea at a time. The vessels will, like their predecessors, be based out of Île Longue.

The SNLE 3G submarines are expected to join the fleet from 2035 and remain in service until 2080–2090. The first steel will be cut for the vessels in March 2024 and completed submarines delivered at a rate of one every five years from 2035, with the program completing in 2050.

The vessels are expected to be slightly longer and larger in displacement than the Le Triomphant class. They are expected to have improved acoustic and magnetic shielding to reduce their visibility to detection systems. The vessels are expected to be otherwise similar in design to their predecessors. They will carry around 100 crew and be armed with 16 M51 nuclear missiles. The M51, which is currently in use on the Le Triomphant class, will be upgraded and developed in the future.

The SNLE 3G will feature an X-shaped stern as introduced on the Barracuda-class attack submarine. It will be powered by a reactor design based on the K15 reactors used in the Barracuda submarines and the K22 reactors being designed for the Future French aircraft carrier, allegedly incorporating several "significant" innovations over the Barracuda submarines.

3D model

Views around the ship

== List of submarines ==
The French Navy's goal is to operate a force of four ballistic missile submarines, of which two are expected to be on patrol at any given time. Dates in italics indicate estimates.

List of planned SNLE 3G submarines
| Name | Construction began | Launched | Commissioned |
|---|---|---|---|
| L'Invincible | 21 March 2024 | | 2036 |
| 2 | | | |
| 3 | | | |
| 4 | | | |

== See also ==
- Future of the French Navy
