= French submarine Le Terrible (S619) =

Nuclear submarine in the French Navy

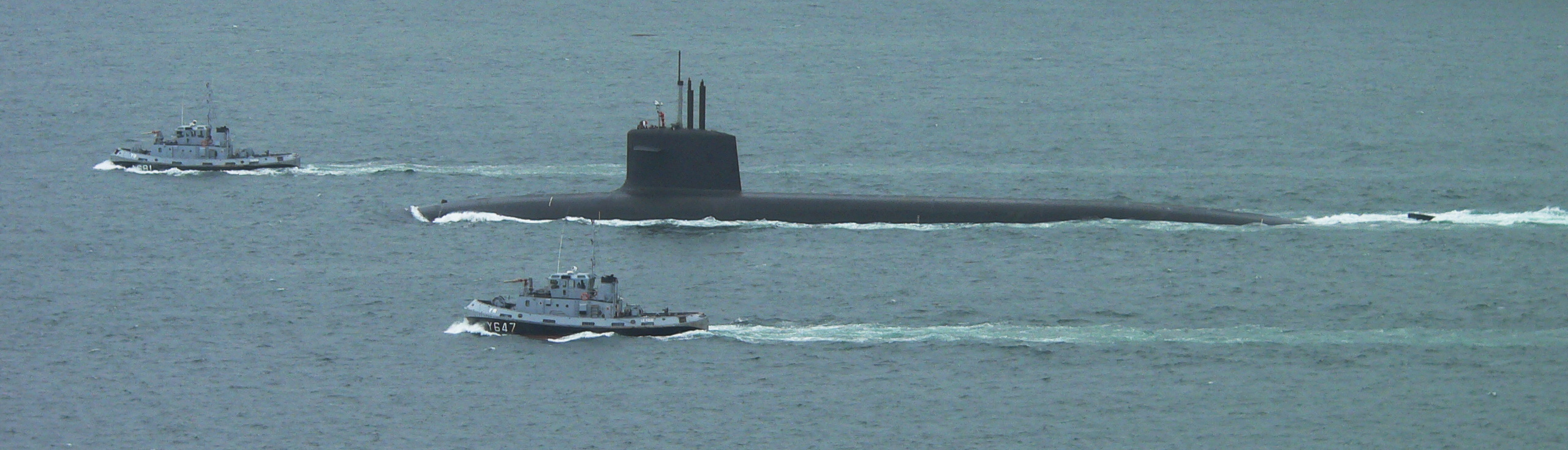
- Le Terrible surfaced at Brest

History

France
- Name: Le Terrible
- Namesake: "Terrible"
- Cost: €3.1 billion (2010)
- Laid down: 24 October 2000
- Launched: 21 March 2008
- Commissioned: 20 September 2010
- Home port: Île Longue

General characteristics
- Class & type: Triomphant-class submarine
- Displacement: 12,640 tonnes (surfaced); 14,335 t (submerged)
- Length: 138 m (453 ft)
- Beam: 12.50 m (41.0 ft)
- Draught: 10.60 m (34.8 ft)
- Propulsion: Pressurised water K15 nuclear reactor (150 MW (200,000 hp)), LEU 7%; turboreductor system; Pump-jet; 2 SEMT Pielstick diesels-alternators 8PA4V200 SM (700 kW (940 hp)) auxiliaries.; 30,500 kW (40,900 hp)
- Speed: over 25 knots (46 km/h; 29 mph)
- Range: Unlimited distance; 20–25 years
- Test depth: Over 400 m (1,300 ft)
- Complement: 15 officers; 96 men
- Sensors & processing systems: Sonar DMUX 80; Sonar DUUX 5; Sonar DSUV 61B Very Low Frequency; Racal Decca radar (navigation); SCC : SET (Système d'exploitation Tactique) : tactical operational system
- Electronic warfare & decoys: ARUR 13
- Armament: Nuclear: 16 M45 or M51 missiles with six to ten TN 75 150 kt or TNO 100-300 kt thermonuclear warheads; Anti-submarine : 4 × 533 mm (21 in) tubes for F17 torpedoes; Anti-surface : Exocet SM39

Le Terrible (French pronunciation: [lə tɛʁibl]) is a Triomphant-class strategic nuclear submarine of the French Navy. The boat was launched on 21 March 2008 and subsequently commissioned on 20 September 2010.

== History ==
On 27 January 2010, Le Terrible launched an M51 SLBM from underwater in Audierne Bay. The missile reached its target 2,000 kilometres (1,200 mi) off North Carolina; the 4,500-kilometre (2,800 mi) flight took about 20 minutes.

The submarine was put into service on 20 September 2010 armed with 16 M51 missiles. Le Terrible is fitted with a new SYCOBS combat system (SYstem de COmbat Barracuda-SSBN) which will also be installed on the new Barracuda-class SSNs.

In July 2017 French president Emmanuel Macron visited the submarine in the Atlantic and took part in a simulated missile launch.

== See also ==
- List of submarines of France
