= French submarine Le Vigilant =

Nuclear submarine in the French Navy

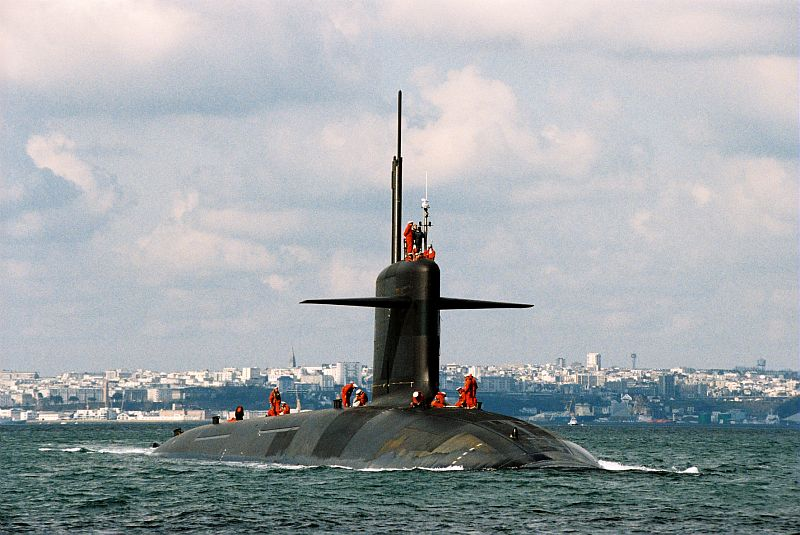
- Le Vigilant

History

France
- Name: Le Vigilant
- Namesake: "Vigilant"
- Cost: €4.282 billion (2010)
- Laid down: 1997
- Launched: 19 September 2003
- Commissioned: 26 November 2004
- Home port: Île Longue
- Identification: S618

General characteristics
- Class & type: Triomphant-class submarine
- Displacement: 12,640 tonnes (surfaced); 14,335 t (submerged)
- Length: 138 m (453 ft)
- Beam: 12.50 m (41.0 ft)
- Draught: 10.60 m (34.8 ft)
- Propulsion: Pressurised water K15 nuclear reactor (150 MW (200,000 hp)), LEU 7%; turboreductor system; Pump-jet; 2 SEMT Pielstick diesels-alternators 8PA4V200 SM (700 kW (940 hp)) auxiliaries.; 30,500 kW (40,900 hp)
- Speed: over 25 knots (46 km/h)
- Range: Unlimited distance; 20–25 years
- Test depth: Over 400 m (1,300 ft)
- Complement: 15 officers; 96 men
- Sensors & processing systems: Sonar DMUX 80; Sonar DUUX 5; Sonar DSUV 61B Very Low Frequency; Racal Decca radar (navigation); SCC : SET (Système d'exploitation Tactique) : tactical operational system
- Electronic warfare & decoys: ARUR 13
- Armament: Strategic missiles: 16 M51 submarine-launched ballistic missiles with six to ten TN 75 150 kt or TNO 100-300 kt thermonuclear warheads (formerly M45 ballistic missiles); Anti-submarine : 4 × 533 mm (21 in) tubes for F17 torpedoes; Anti-surface : Exocet SM39

Le Vigilant (French pronunciation: [lə viʒilɑ̃]) is a Triomphant-class strategic nuclear submarine in service with the French Navy. It was launched in September 2003 and subsequently commissioned in November 2004.

== Operations ==
On October 6 2026, the submarine successfully test-fired the updated M51.3 variant of the M-51 ballistic missile.

== See also ==
- List of submarines of France
- HMS Vigilant (S30), British Vanguard-class ballistic missile submarine, commissioned in 1996
