= French submarine Gymnote (S655) =

Experimental French ballistic missile submarine

History

France
- Name: Gymnote
- Namesake: Gymnotus
- Ordered: 1961
- Builder: Arsenal de Cherbourg
- Laid down: 17 March 1963
- Launched: 17 March 1964
- Commissioned: 17 October 1966
- Out of service: 1986
- Identification: Q244, Q251, S655
- Fate: Scrapped

General characteristics
- Type: Submarine
- Displacement: 3,000 tons surfaced; 3,250 tons submerged
- Length: 84.0 m (275.6 ft)
- Beam: 10.6 m (35 ft)
- Draught: 7.6 m (25 ft)
- Propulsion: 2 shaft diesel electric
- Speed: 11 knots (20 km/h; 13 mph) surfaced; 10 knots (19 km/h; 12 mph) submerged
- Complement: 78 men
- Armament: 4 launch tubes for SLBM

Gymnote (S655) was an experimental submarine of the French Navy. She was a trials submarine for submarine-launched ballistic missiles (SLBM) and powered by diesel electric engines. She is named in honour of Gymnote, the world's first all-electric submarine built in France in the late 19th century.

The French planned a nuclear propelled submarine in the late 1950s and laid down a hull (no Q244). Because France had not developed uranium enrichment facilities at the time, the planned power plant was to be a heavy water reactor, which could utilize natural uranium. But French engineers were unable to produce a reactor small enough to fit into the submarine, which led to the project being canceled in 1959.

In the early 1960s the French government decided to develop an independent nuclear deterrent based on SLBM's. Hull Q244 was redesigned as a trials submarine with diesel-electric propulsion and four missile tubes in an extended casing. Re-designated Q251 and christened Gymnote, she was commissioned in 1966 and fired the first M-1 missile in 1968. The M-1 missile was subsequently deployed aboard the Redoutable-class submarines. She was extensively rebuilt in 1977-79 to enable trials of the new M-4 missile. In the 1980s, as part of a general re-numbering of the French submarine fleet, Gymnote was re-designated S655.

Gymnote was decommissioned in 1986.

== See also ==
- List of submarines of France
