= French submarine Gymnote =

Two submarines of the French Navy have borne the name Gymnote (“Electric Eel”):

- French submarine Gymnote (Q1), a pioneering French Navy submarine of the 1880s
- French submarine Gymnote (Q251), an experimental French Navy submarine of the 1960s
