= Force de dissuasion =

French nuclear deterrence force

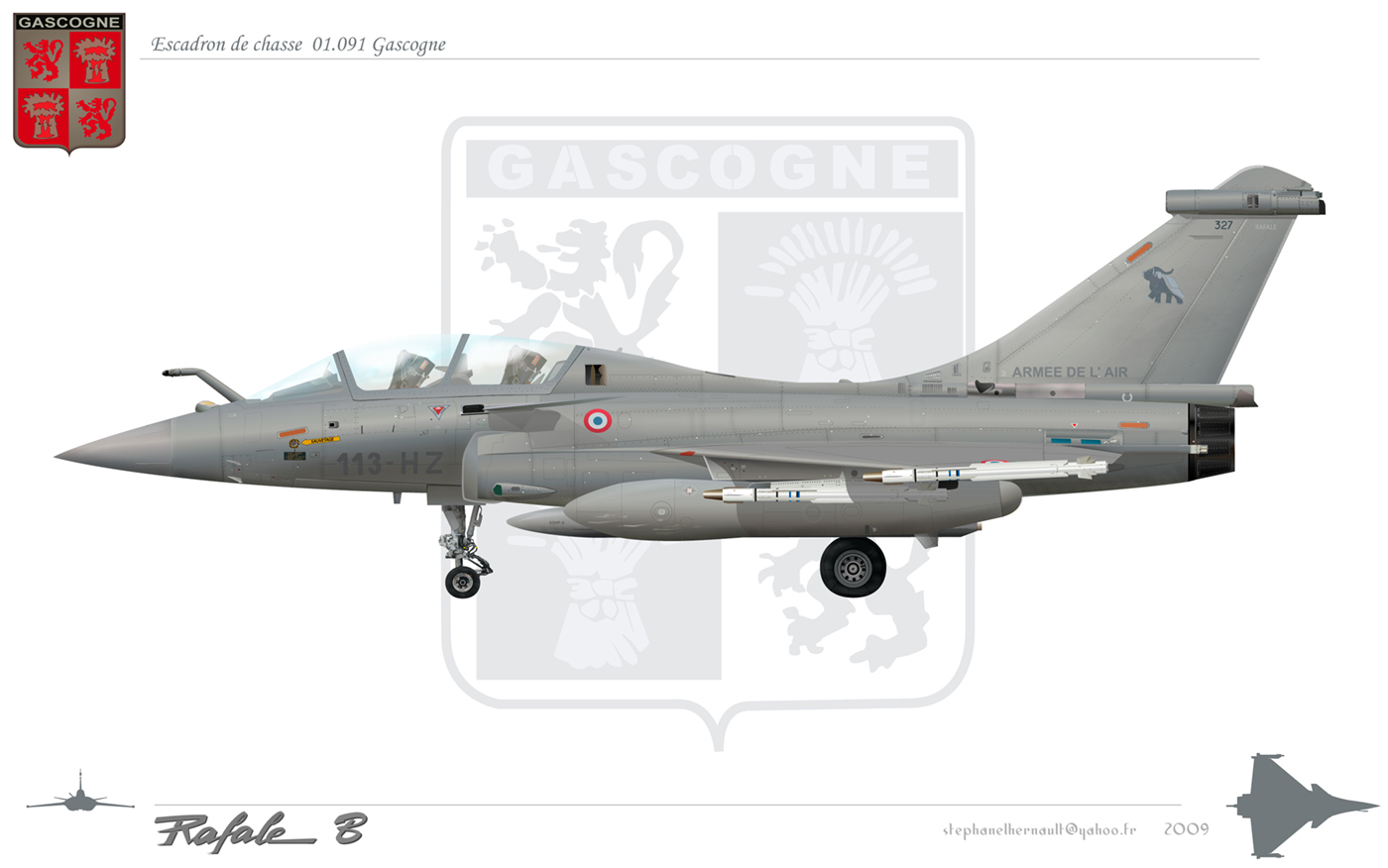
A Rafale of the Strategic Air Forces Command with an ASMP-A missile

The Force de dissuasion (French pronunciation: [fɔʁs də disɥazjɔ̃]; English: 'Deterrence Force'), known as the Force de frappe ([fɔʁs də fʁɑp]; 'Strike Force') before 1961, is the French nuclear deterrence force. Formulated immediately after the Second World War, it comprised a triad of air-, sea- and land-based nuclear weapons intended for deterrence; since the end of the Cold War, it is only an air- and sea-based arsenal. The French Nuclear Force, part of the French military, is the fourth largest in the world, after the nuclear triads of the United States, Russia, and China.

France's military nuclear programme was shaped not only by the Cold War, but by the trauma that resulted from the Battle of France: General Pierre Marie Gallois, one of the architects of the deterrence force, is said to have been marked "by the tragic effects of an excess of German power" in his strategic thinking. In addition to retaining a strategic advantage over Germany, France developed the Force de dissuasion to restore its status as a great power, maintain an independent security posture, and command greater influence within the NATO alliance.

As early as 1945, General Charles de Gaulle envisioned France as a nuclear power; Prime Minister Pierre Mendès France laid the groundwork for this effort in 1954. De Gaulle's presidency (1959–1969) saw France conduct its first atomic bomb test in Algeria in 1960, develop operational nuclear weapons by 1964, and execute its first thermonuclear test in the South Pacific Ocean in 1968. By 1971, France had a nuclear triad comparable to the United States and the Soviet Union.

On 27 January 1996, France conducted its last nuclear test in the South Pacific and then signed the Comprehensive Nuclear-Test-Ban Treaty (CTBT) the following September. In March 2008, President Nicolas Sarkozy confirmed reports giving the actual size of France's nuclear arsenal and announced that France would reduce the nuclear arsenal carried by the French Air Force by 30%, leaving the Force de dissuasion with 290 warheads. In 2026, President Emmanuel Macron announced that France would increase its arsenal and deterrence capabilities.

In addition to its nuclear military programme, France has a large civil nuclear programme and ranks as one of the world's largest generators of nuclear power.

== History ==
The decision to arm France with nuclear weapons was made in 1954 by the administration of Prime Minister Pierre Mendès France under the Fourth Republic. President Charles de Gaulle, upon his return to power in 1958, solidified the initial vision into the well-defined concept of a fully independent Force de frappe that would be capable of protecting France from a Soviet or other foreign attack and independent of the North Atlantic Treaty Organization (NATO), which de Gaulle considered to be too dominated by the United States. In particular, France was concerned that in the event of a Soviet invasion of Western Europe, the U.S., already bogged down in the Korean War and afraid of Soviet retaliation against the United States, would not come to the aid of its allies in Western Europe. De Gaulle felt that France should never entrust its defense and therefore its very existence to a foreign and thus unreliable protector.

The strategic concept behind the Force de frappe is one of countervalue, the capacity to inflict so much damage on a potential (and more powerful) adversary's population that the potential adversary will be deterred from attacking, no matter how much destruction it can inflict (mutual assured destruction). This principle is usually referred to in French political debate as dissuasion du faible au fort ("deterrence from the weak to the strong") and was summarized in a statement attributed to de Gaulle himself:

Within ten years, we shall have the means to kill 80 million Russians. I truly believe that one does not light-heartedly attack people who are able to kill 80 million Russians, even if one can kill 800 million French, that is if there were 800 million French.

General Pierre Marie Gallois said, "Making the most pessimistic assumptions, the French nuclear bombers could destroy ten Russian cities; and France is not a prize worthy of ten Russian cities".

In his book La paix nucléaire (1975), French Navy Admiral Marc de Joybert explained deterrence:

Sir, I have no quarrel with you, but I warn you in advance and with all possible clarity that if you invade me, I shall answer at the only credible level for my scale, which is the nuclear level. Whatever your defenses, you shan't prevent at least some of my missiles from reaching your home and causing the devastation that you are familiar with. So, renounce your endeavour and let us remain good friends.

While not referred to as such, the French nuclear posture of the time bears some significant similarities to other common policies of the era such as mutually assured destruction and massive retaliation. It remains unknown whether the French government ever seriously considered its policy different from other NATO member strategies or if their public statements were more aimed to improve morale and confidence in the French population.

In 1961 Charles de Gaulle reminded John F. Kennedy that "Germany is legally prevented from having any [nuclear weapons]", adding that "the disadvantages deriving from German possession of atomic weapons would be far greater than the advantages".

It may seem that on the surface, an avowed policy of attacking civilians was a significant departure from the typical nuclear policies of the time, but it was common for states to refer to their nuclear abilities in terms of numbers of cities destroyed. Moreover, hydrogen bombs are so powerful that if used to their full potential high civilian casualties and related collateral damage would be inevitable, thus making it unclear as to whether targeting military forces would produce a meaningfully different result compared to targeting population centers. Perhaps the most significant difference in French strategy is that it includes the option of a first strike attack, even in response to non-nuclear provocation.

France carried out its first test of an atomic bomb in Algeria in 1960 and some operational French nuclear weapons became available in 1964. Then, France executed its first test of the much more powerful hydrogen bomb over its South Pacific Ocean test range in 1968.

De Gaulle's vision of the Force de frappe featured the same triad of air-based, land-based and sea-based weapons which were deployed by both the United States and the Soviet Union. Work on the components had started in the late 1950s and was accelerated as soon as de Gaulle assumed the presidency.

=== Air ===
Initially, the Force de frappe had an airbase component of the Strategic Air Forces Command (Commandement des Forces Aériennes Stratégiques, CFAS) of the French Air Force, established in 1955 and operating 40 Sud Aviation Vautour IIB bombers. They were considered marginal for a strategic bomber role, and work began almost immediately on a replacement resulting in the Mirage III.

In May 1956, a requirement for what became the Dassault Mirage IV bomber was drawn up; the bomber was designed to carry AN-11 nuclear gravity bombs over targets in the Eastern bloc at supersonic speeds and was declared operational in October 1964. It was later modernized and converted to carry its successor, the AN-22 bomb. The Mirage IV-P version was armed with the ASMP missile and entered service in 1986. All bomber versions of the Mirage IV retired in 1996.

From 1973 to 2003, the CFAS also operated SEPECAT Jaguars, limited nuclear capable of using the tactical AN-52 nuclear bomb, which were certified for supersonic flight. A total of 100 were built from 1972 to 1982. They were compatible with modified Mirage III fighters and later with the standard Jaguar. The Mirage 2000 was theoretically capable of carrying it but never did so. The AN-52s were deactivated and placed into storage in 1991.

The Mirage 2000N entered service in 1988 and can carry gravity bombs, the ASMP and the new longer-ranged ASMP-A missile, which entered service 2009. The Mirage 2000N was being replaced by the Dassault Rafale F3 as of 2011.

=== Land ===
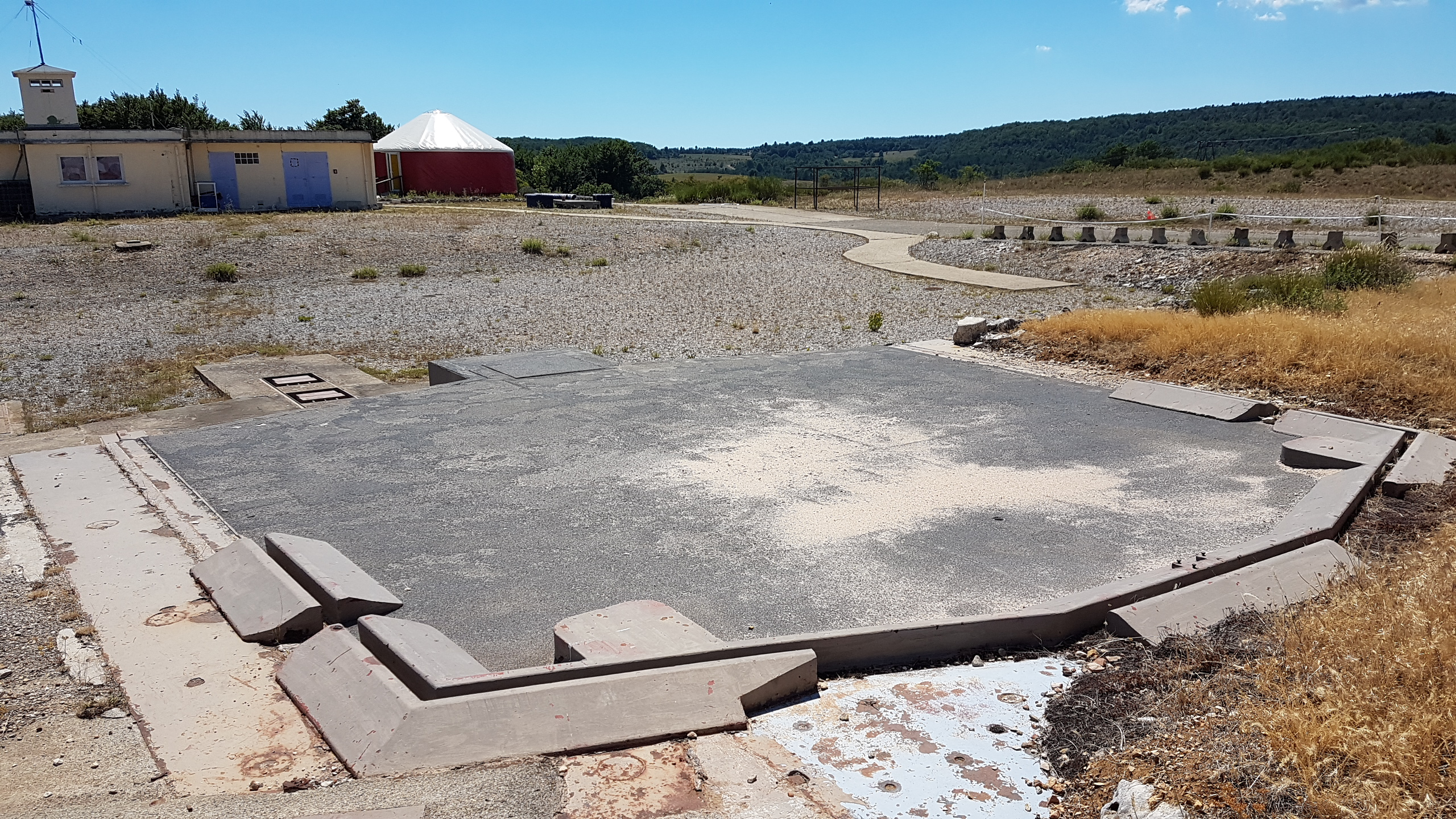
A decommissioned nuclear missile silo on the Plateau d'Albion

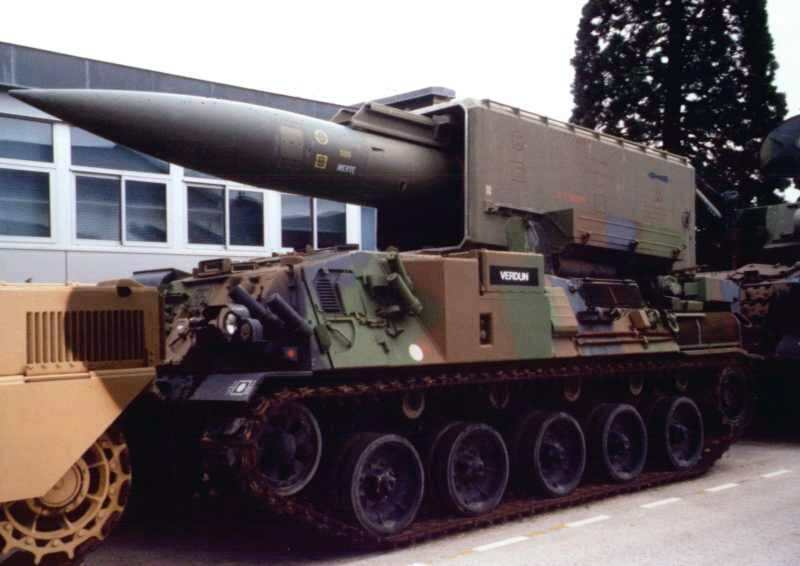
A Pluton missile mobile launcher

The land-based component of the French nuclear triad was added in August 1971, when 18 silo-based S2 medium-range ballistic missiles, which achieved operational readiness at French Air Force Aerial Base 200 Saint Christol Albion, in Vaucluse, southern France. Later, the land-based component was augmented with the mobile shortrange Pluton missile and Hadès missile, which were designed to be launched from the front lines at any approaching foreign army. To defend against a Soviet-Warsaw Pact invasion of West Germany, they could be deployed with the French Army in the French Zone of Germany, in Western Germany.

Since the French military judged a full-scale invasion of Western Europe by the Soviet Union and its Warsaw Pact Allies to be unlikely to be stopped by conventional armaments, the short-range nuclear missiles were meant as a "final warning" (French: ultime avertissement), which would tell the aggressor that any further advances would trigger a nuclear armageddon upon its major cities and other important targets.

The Pluton missile, introduced in 1974, was retired from service and scrapped beginning in 1993, and its successor, the Hadès missile, was produced in limited numbers during the early 1990s and then withdrawn from the army and placed in arsenal storage in 1995. Next, the French government decided to eliminate all of those missiles, and the last Hadès was dismantled on 23 June 1997. Both were a diplomatic problem with Germany as the Pluton could only reach Western Germany and the Hadès with its extended range could fire only up to the former East Germany, now the east of the reunified Germany. That was the end of the French mobile land-based nuclear missiles.

The French fixed S3 IRBMs at the Plateau d'Albion were considered to be approaching obsolescence and also deemed to be no longer necessary following the fall of the Soviet Union and so also were disposed of. The silos have been imploded and the missile base closed in 1999, eliminating the landbased missile leg of the French nuclear triad.

=== Sea ===
The ocean-based, mobile component of the French nuclear triad entered service in December 1971, with the commissioning of its first ballistic missile submarine, the nuclear submarine Redoutable, which initially carried 16 M1 intermediate-range ballistic missiles, similar to the US Polaris missiles.

Since then, the ocean-based French nuclear weapons arsenal has been expanded to a squadron of four submarines, one of which is always on patrol. Since 1985, some of the French ballistic missile subs have become obsolete. The subs have been retired and replaced by newer subs that also have 16 missile tubes apiece and carry the more advanced French M45 missile. A new submarine, Le Terrible, was put into service on 20 September 2010, armed with the M51 missile, which is similar to the US Trident II.

In late 2025 it was reported that the M51.3 variant of the missile had entered operational service. The missile is said to have an operational range of 8,000 to 10,000 km, with a speed of Mach 25 also offering improved accuracy and penetration capabilities.

The Aéronavale or French Naval Aviation has operated a fleet of nuclear-armed aircraft since 1962, with the Dassault Etendard IV on its Clemenceau-class aircraft carriers. The Etendard could be armed with AN-52 nuclear gravity bombs. In 1978, the Dassault Super Etendard entered service, giving the Aéronavale a stand-off nuclear strike ability via its Air-Sol Moyenne Portée (ASMP) nuclear missiles. As the Clemenceau class retired from 1997 to 2000, the Super Etendard remained in service on the succeeding aircraft carrier Charles de Gaulle (R91). Since 2010 it carries Rafale F3 fighters armed with the upgraded ASMP-A nuclear missiles.

== Components ==
=== Land-based component ===
France no longer possesses land-based nuclear missiles. The IRBM base aérienne 200 Apt-Saint-Christol at the Plateau d'Albion (Vaucluse) was deactivated in 1996 and its missiles scrapped. All French Army units equipped with short-range missiles such as the Pluton and the Hadès were disbanded, their missiles scrapped and their fissile nuclear materials recycled.

=== Sea-based component ===
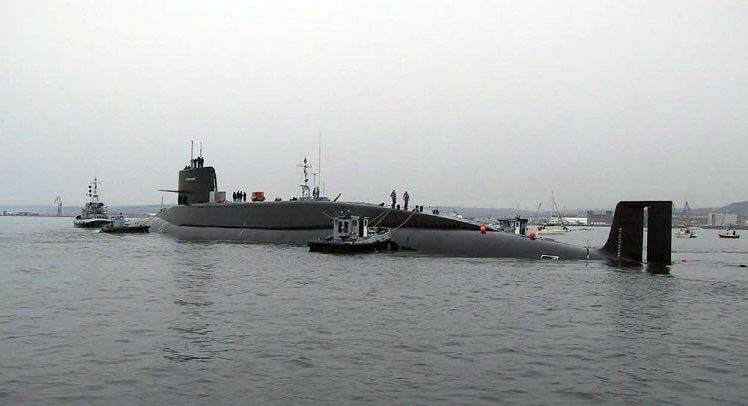
The Redoutable, the first French nuclear missile submarine.

The French Navy includes a nuclear strategic branch, the Force Océanique Stratégique, which has contained as many as six nuclear-powered ballistic missile submarines (SSBNs) in service at one time. An estimate 80 percent of France's nuclear arsenal is sea-based.

As of 2026, ten SSBNs have been built for the French Navy:

- Six Redoutable-class submarines, armed with 16 M4 IRBMs entered service between 1971 and 1985. The last of these, L'Inflexible (S 615), was retired in 2008.
- Four Triomphant-class SSBNs: Le Triomphant (S 616), Le Téméraire (S 617), Le Vigilant (S 618), Le Terrible (S 619). Commissioned between 1997 and 2010, each armed with 16 M51.3 SLBMs.

All four nuclear armed submarines currently in operation as of 2026 are based in Île Longue on the Atlantic coast, one of the nation's most secretive military sites. Since 1972, at least one Triomphant-class SSBN has been on patrol at all times, ensuring France’s permanent capacity to carry out a strike.

=== Air-based component ===
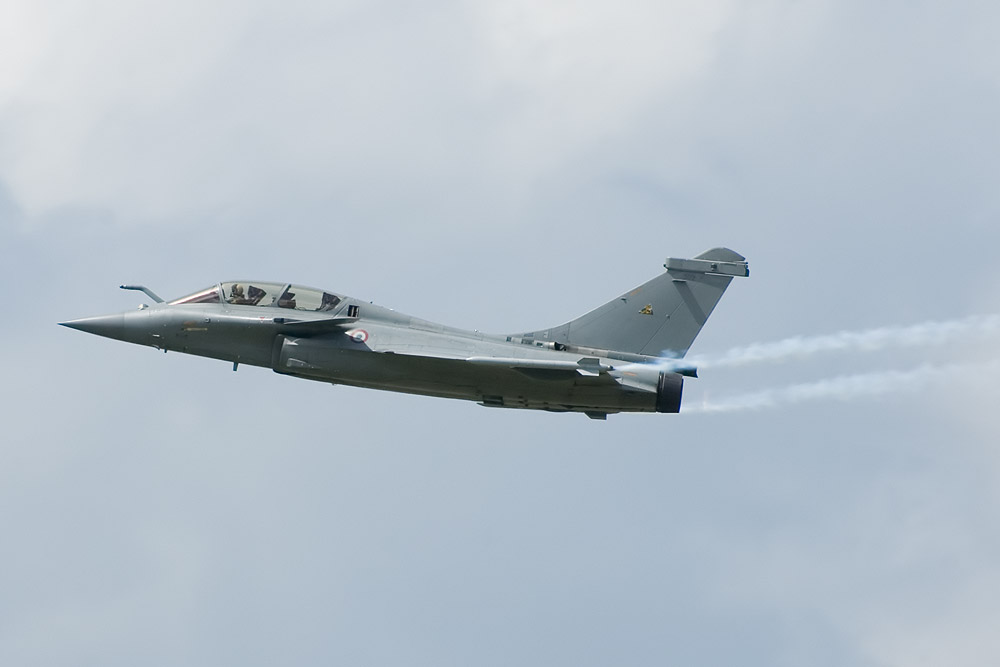
Rafale B

The French Air and Space Force has 54 ASMP-A medium-range air-to-ground missiles with the TNA (Airborne nuclear warhead) at its disposal. These are deployed on the Dassault Rafale B, which fully replaced the Dassault Mirage 2000N in 2018.

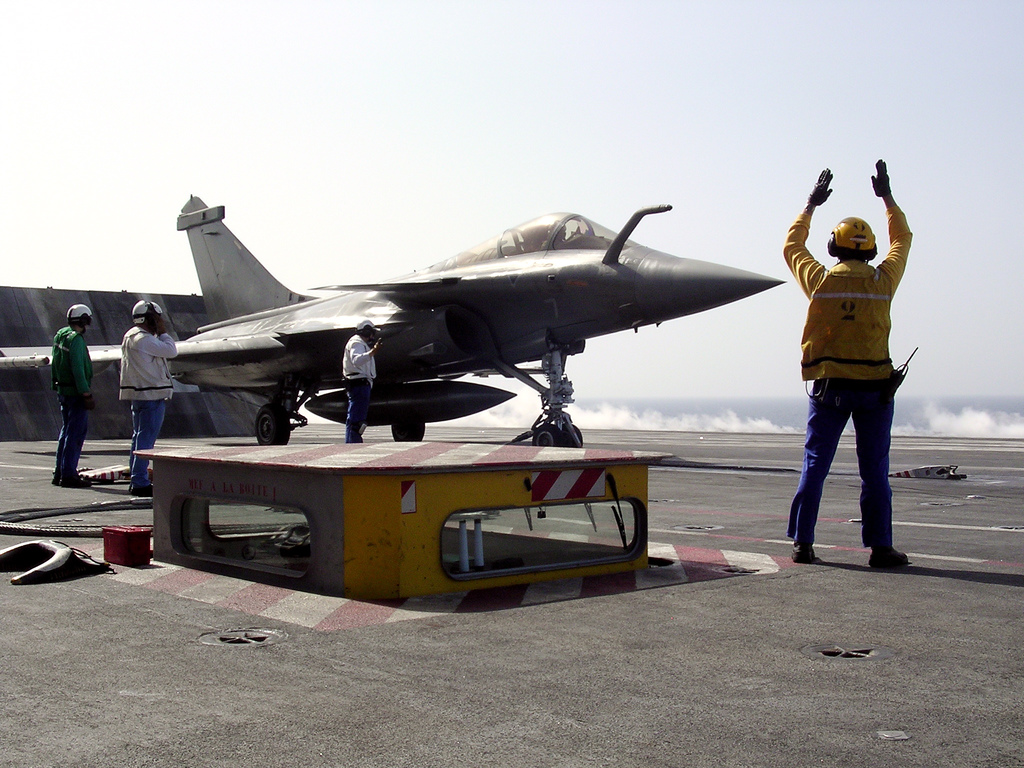
Rafale M on aircraft carrier Charles de Gaulle

Additionally, French Naval Aviation can operate the ASMP-A missile from the Dassault Rafale M (CATOBAR carrier variant). These aircraft are based at Landivisiau Naval Air Base and on the aircraft carrier Charles de Gaulle, allowing for operational flexibility. The Rafale M is also certified to operate from United States Navy aircraft carriers.

The locations of the nuclear missiles are secret (although many storage facilities are already known to the public, the number of warheads inside is classified and changes frequently). The range of strike aircraft is extended currently by the KC-135 and in the future by the forthcoming Airbus A330 MRTT aerial refueling fleet.

== Operations ==
=== Nuclear strike order ===
The President of France is the sole person who can order a French nuclear strike; there is no formal requirement for the president to consult anyone before taking the decision. This authority can be transferred (devolved) along the presidential line of succession, which, according to the Defense Code, is the President of the Senate followed by the Prime Minister. In the event all three offices become simultaneously vacant, the authority to order a nuclear strike is transferred to a person whose identity remains classified. The Chief of the Military Staff of the President of the Republic is tasked with assisting the President in ordering the strike.

Under duress, the President can transmit a counterfeit code to let the receiving military officer know not to execute the strike.

=== Jupiter Command Post ===
The Jupiter Command Post (Poste de commandement Jupiter, PC Jupiter) is a structure in the bunker of the Élysée Palace equipped to enable the French president and his advisers to manage crisis situations and maintain contact with other government entities, military command posts, and foreign governments. The bunker was built for President Albert Lebrun in 1940 during the Phoney War, and President Valéry Giscard d'Estaing installed its command post in 1978.

=== Nuclear ordnance security gendarmerie ===
The nuclear ordnance security gendarmerie (French: Gendarmerie de la sécurité des armements nucléaires, GSAN) was created in 1964 and is one of the five specialized branches of the French Gendarmerie. It is placed under the supervision the Ministry of Armed Forces and plays a major role in the security chain of the nuclear devices.

The main mission of this specific branch is to secure the government's control over all the nuclear forces and weapons. More specifically, the gendarmes of this unit are responsible for ensuring the protection and the readiness of the different kinds of missiles used by the French Navy and Air Force.

In order to do so, the GSAN is composed of its own units and of units from other branches of the gendarmerie, temporarily placed under its command like squadrons of the Mobile Gendarmerie to protect the convoys of nuclear weapons components.

=== Forward nuclear deterrence ===
In March 2026, France offered to extend ‌the protection of its nuclear umbrella to other European countries amid heightened tensions with Russia and doubts about long-term U.S. security guarantees. Under the scheme, members may temporarily host French nuclear armed "strategic air forces", conduct joint nuclear drills, and coordinate on collective security. As of September 2026, ten nations have joined the initiative: Belgium, Denmark, Finland, Germany, Greece, the Netherlands, Norway, Poland, Sweden and fellow nuclear power the United Kingdom.

== See also ==
- History of France's civil nuclear program
- History of France's military nuclear program
- France and weapons of mass destruction (includes more detailed discussion of nuclear testing)
- List of states with nuclear weapons
- List of nuclear weapons tests
- Foreign policy of Charles de Gaulle
- Nuclear weapon
- Gaullism

== Bibliography ==
- Cohen, Samy. "France, Civil-Military Relations, and Nuclear Weapons." Security Studies 4.1 (1994): 153–179.
- Fraise, Thomas. "Nuclearization and de-democratization: security, secrecy, and the French pursuit of nuclear weapons (1945–1974)." European Journal of International Relations 31.1 (2025): 203–226. online
- Grant, Robert. "French Tactical Nuclear Weapons." in The Future Of Deterrence (Routledge, 2019) pp. 75–106.
- Kohl, Wilfred L. French nuclear diplomacy ( Princeton University Press, 2015) online.
- Kristensen, Hans M., et al. "French nuclear weapons, 2025." Bulletin of the Atomic Scientists 81.4 (2025): 313–326. online
- Kristensen, Hans M., Matt Korda, and Eliana Johns. "French nuclear weapons, 2023." Bulletin of the Atomic Scientists 79.4 (2023): 272–281. online
- McDonnell, Timothy P. "Figuring it out the hard way: America, France, and the challenges of allied pursuit of nuclear weapons, 1958–63." The Nonproliferation Review 27.1-3 (2020): 141–160.
- Tertrais, Bruno. "The last to disarm? The future of France's nuclear weapons." Nonproliferation Review 14.2 (2007): 251-273 online
- Tertrais, Bruno. "A Second Nuclear Age? A View From France." Nuclear Order in the Twenty-First Century (2019): 45+. online
- Yost, David S. "France's nuclear dilemmas." Foreign Affairs. 75 (1996): 108+ online.
- (in French) Jean-Hugues Oppel, Réveillez le président !, Éditions Payot et rivages, 2007 (ISBN 978-2-7436-1630-4). The book is a fiction about the nuclear weapons of France; the book also contains about ten chapters on true historical incidents involving nuclear weapons and strategy (during the second half of the twentieth century).
