= Pierre Marie Gallois =

French general (1911–2010)

- Born: 29 June 1911; Turin, Kingdom of Italy
- Died: 24 August 2010 (aged 99); Paris, France
- Occupation: Geopolitician
- Spouse: Françoise Marie Gallois
- Children: François Gallois, Richard Gallois, Phillip Gallois

Pierre Marie Gallois (French pronunciation: [pjɛʁ maʁi ɡalwa]; 29 June 1911 – 24 August 2010) was a French Air Force brigadier general and geopolitician. He was instrumental in the constitution of the French nuclear arsenal, and is considered one of the fathers of the French atom bomb.

== Biography ==
Gallois was born in Turin, Italy, in 1911 as his parents were travelling. Gallois grew fond of flying as he watched fighters during his childhood through World War I. After studies at Lycée Janson de Sailly and the War School in Versailles, he was made a sous-lieutenant in 1936 in a Sahara wing at Colomb-Béchar, and promoted to lieutenant the same year. In 1939, he was transferred to the general staff of the Fifth Air region in Algiers.

In 1943, Gallois reached Great Britain and joined the only two French heavy bomber squadrons in RAF Bomber Command as a Halifax bomber crewman at RAF Elvington, near York. He took part in raids against German industries until March 1945.

After the war, Gallois was detached to civil aviation and took part in conferences of the International Civil Aviation Organization. He rejoined the Air Force in 1948 as an aide in the cabinet of the chief of staff of the Armée de l'air. A specialist of equipment and manufacturing, he wrote the quinquennal plan for aeronautic production, which was accepted by the Parliament in August 1950, and studied production plans at the European level. He took part in discussions regarding the use of American aid in Western Europe.

From 1953 to 1954, Gallois, by then a colonel, was affected to the cabinet of the minister of Defence. He also worked for Supreme Headquarters Allied Powers Europe at the same time, working on the consequences of the existence of weapons of mass destruction on modern strategy. From 1953, he campaigned for a French nuclear deterrence, stressing the notions of "personal deterrence" and "weak-to-strong deterrence".

Gallois retired from the Army in 1957.

In 2003, he co-founded the Forum pour la France ("Forum for France"), which supports the "sovereignty and independence of France". Gallois campaigned against the Treaty establishing a Constitution for Europe.

Gallois was a staunch supporter of Serbia during the Balkan clashes, and one of the main critics of NATO and its role in the Yugoslav crisis.

Gallois died on 24 August 2010, at the age of 99.
