= Cité de la Mer =

Maritime museum in Cherbourg, France

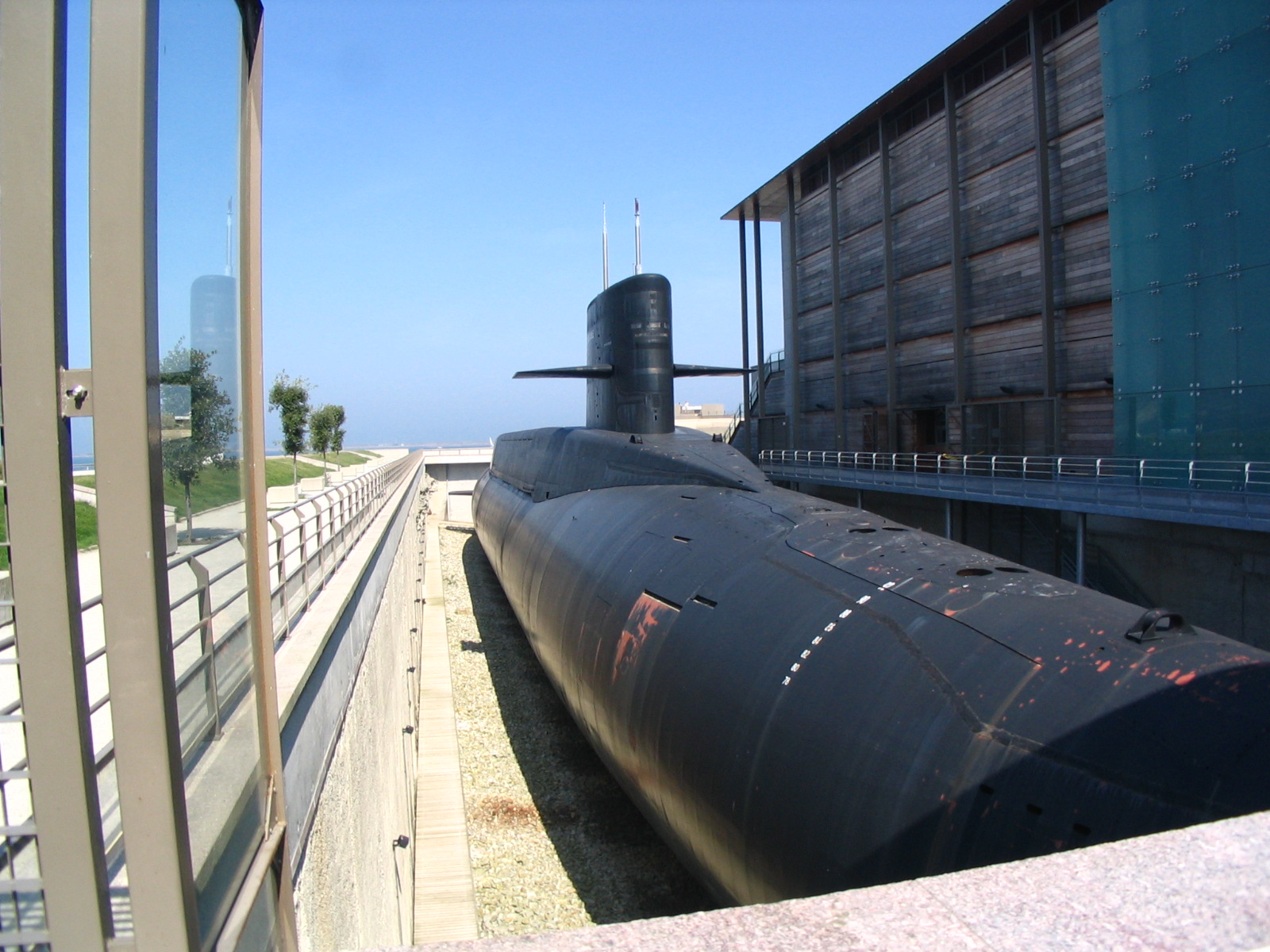
The Redoutable at the Cité de la Mer

The Cité de la Mer ("city of the sea") is a maritime museum in Cherbourg, France.

The museum is in the cruise terminal of Cherbourg. This monument was built in 1933; it is one of the bigger art-deco monuments of today.

== History ==
The former transatlantic maritime station is the largest French monument in the art deco style. It was built by René Levavasseur from 1928, in collaboration with the engineers Chalos and Fleury, in reinforced concrete, light bricks and concrete stones imitating granite. Nicknamed Notre-Dame des Queens, in reference to the Cunard Line liners, it was inaugurated on July 30, 1933, by the President of the Republic Albert Lebrun.

The whole was made up of the 240 m train hall, and the transatlantic hall – surmounted by a 70 m bell tower – (with a hall for lost steps, company offices, shops, etc.) and the covered gallery of 'boarding. Four trains and two ocean liners could be accommodated simultaneously. It was dynamited by the Germans on the night of June 23, 1944, partially rebuilt from 1948 before being re-inaugurated in 1952 in the presence of Antoine Pinay.

Abandoned in the 1970s, the transatlantic ferry terminal was partially demolished, before being listed as a historical monument in 1989 and then in 2000.

The idea of a museum around the Redoutable, the first French nuclear submarine, dates from the launch of the submarine's dismantling at the end of the 1980s. The president of the urban community of Cherbourg (CUC), and also Minister of Tourism, Olivier Stirn, launched a study for the design of such a museum, but the sized discouraged elected officials. However, in 1995 a few active associations succeeded in having the municipal councils of the agglomeration register the transfer of competence to the CUC for the design, construction and management of a naval museum, within the transatlantic station.

Supported by Bernard Cauvin, president of the CUC, the project is also part of the rehabilitation of the former maritime station of René Levavasseur, the largest "art deco" monument in France, entrusted to the architect Jean-François Milou.

Celebrating the maritime ambition of the Cherbourg conurbation, La Cité de la Mer has been a success since its opening, becoming the second most visited paid tourist site in the English Channel, after the Mont-Saint-Michel Abbey. At the end of 2012, it welcomed its 2,500,000th visitor and its 3,000,000th on May 5, 2015. The 4,000,000th mark was crossed in September 2019.

== Collection ==
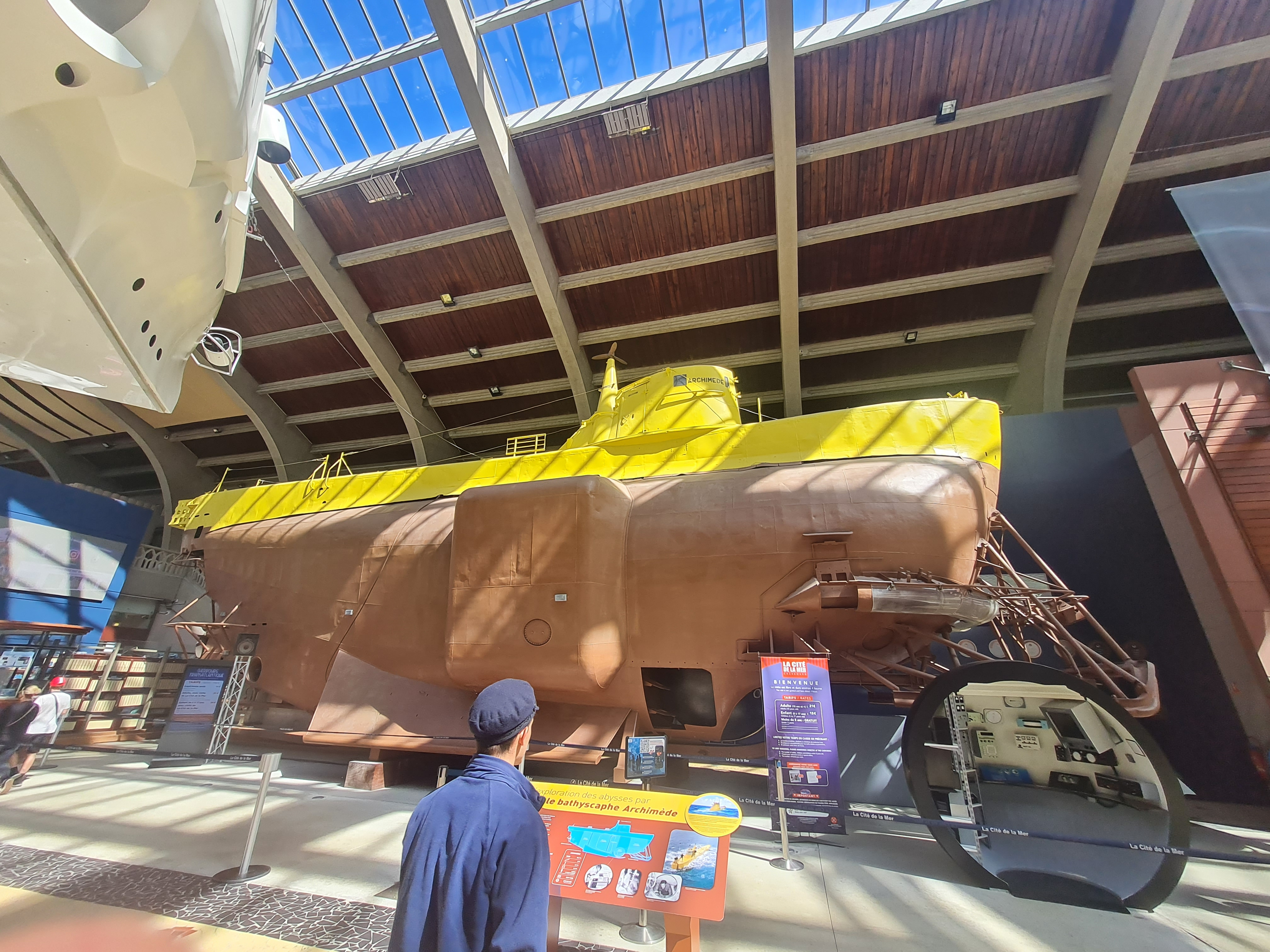
The bathyscaphe Archimède

It was opened in 2002 as a scientific and historical museum, around four axes:

- the Redoutable, first SSBN submarine of the French Navy, now a museum and the largest submarine in the world open to the public
- Archimède, a bathyscaphe, deep submergence submersible, formerly part of the French Navy.
- a permanent exposition
- a cylindrical aquarium, 8 metres wide and 10 metres high, which displays the successive marine life forms according to the depth
- a great hall where temporary expositions are held
- a new underwater expedition in a virtual, digitised building.
