= French submarine Inflexible =

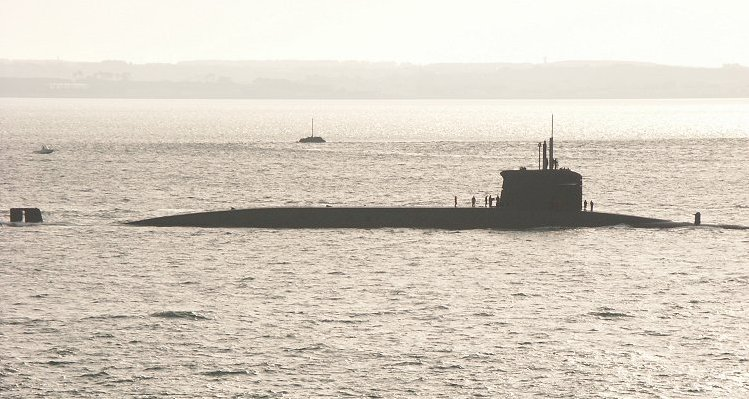
- Inflexible in 2002

History

France
- Name: L'Inflexible
- Builder: DCNS Cherbourg
- Laid down: 27 March 1980
- Launched: 23 June 1982
- Commissioned: 1 April 1985
- Decommissioned: 14 January 2008
- Home port: Île Longue
- Status: Decommissioned

General characteristics
- Class & type: Redoutable-class submarine
- Displacement: 9,000 tons (submerged)
- Length: 130 m (430 ft)
- Beam: 10.60 m (34.8 ft)
- Draught: 10 m (33 ft)
- Propulsion: One PWR, 16,000 shp (12,000 kW), HEU <= 90%
- Speed: over 20 knots (37 km/h; 23 mph)
- Range: Essentially unlimited
- Complement: 15 officers; 120 sailors
- Sensors & processing systems: 1 DRUA 33; 1 DMUX 21; 1 DSUV 61B VLF; 1 DUUX 5; ARUR 12 radar detector
- Armament: 16 M4 MSBS (Mer Sol Balistique Stratégique) nuclear missiles; four 533 mm (21 in) torpedo tubes; F17 and L5 torpedoes; SM39 Exocet anti-ship missile

L'Inflexible (S 615) was the sixth and final of the Redoutable-class SNLE ("Sous-marin Nucléaire Lanceur d'Engins", "Nuclear Missile-Launching Submarine") of the Force océanique stratégique (FOST), the submarine nuclear deterrent component of the French Navy.

Construction began on 27 March 1980. The boat was launched on 23 June 1982, commissioned on 1 April 1985 and decommissioned on 14 January 2008.

== Design and construction ==
L'Inflexible uses basically the same design as the other Redoutable-class vessels, but has benefited from technological advances over its predecessors. The submarine uses the M4 missile, which carries 6 independent 150 kilotonnes of TNT equivalent nuclear warheads. Their range is reported to be over 4,500 kilometres (2,800 mi). The boat also has the capability of launching the SM39 Exocet anti-ship missile.

L'Inflexible received TIT (Traitement de l'Information Tactique, "Tactical Information Processor"), a cluster of French-designed computers and serial digital bus links for intersystem communication and DMUX21 sonar. The submarine has an improved inertial navigation system over other vessels of the class. The boat also has the improved internal communication system—SNTI, Système Numérisé de Transmissions Intérieures (Digital Internal Communication System).

Other miscellaneous improvements were made in electrical systems, nuclear systems, improving safety and stealth and rudder and engines, improving reliability and stealth. Inflexible has an improved hull profile.

The other Redoutable-class submarines have been modified to meet the standards of L'Inflexible ("Refonte M4"). L'Inflexible was officially decommissioned on 14 January 2008.

== In popular culture ==
L'Inflexible has inspired Le Soleil ne se lève pas pour nous ("No sunrise for us") by Robert Merle, a 1987 semi-fictitious book in form of a romanced documentary.

== See also ==
- List of submarines of France
