= M51 (missile) =

Submarine-launched ballistic missile

M51 SLBM
- Type: SLBM
- Place of origin: France

Service history
- In service: 27 September 2010

Production history
- Designer: ArianeGroup
- Manufacturer: ArianeGroup

Specifications
- Mass: 52,000 kg (115,000 lb)
- Length: 12.0 m (39 ft 4 in)
- Diameter: 2.3 m (7 ft 7 in)
- Warhead: M51.1 = 6 to 10 TN 75 MIRV 110 kiloton (kt) (420 TJ), with penetration aids. M51.2 (2015) = using the new Tête nucléaire océanique 100 kt / CEP 150–200 m
- Engine: three-stage solid-fuel rocket (ammonium perchlorate composite propellant)
- Operational range: Estimated 8,000–10,000 km (4,300–5,400 nmi; 5,000–6,200 mi) (the range is classified information)
- Maximum speed: Mach 25
- Guidance system: Astro-inertial guidance. Galileo system is planned.
- Launch platform: Triomphant-class submarines; SNLE 3G submarines (planned)

The M51 SLBM is a French submarine-launched ballistic missile, built by ArianeGroup, and deployed with the French Navy. Designed to replace the M45 SLBM (in French terminology the MSBS – Mer-Sol-Balistique-Stratégique "Sea-ground-Strategic ballistic"), it was first deployed in 2010.

Each missile carries six to ten independently targetable TN 75 thermonuclear warheads.

The three-stage engine of the M51 is directly derived from the solid propellant boosters of Ariane 5. Like other blunt-nosed SLBM examples, such as the Trident D5, the M51 uses an extensible aerospike in the nose.

The missiles are a compromise over the M5 SLBM design, which was to have a range of 11,000 km (6,800 mi) and carry ten new-generation tête nucléaire océanique ("oceanic nuclear warhead") MIRVs. Design work on the M5 started in the late 1980s by Aérospatiale, before the programme was renamed the M51 in 1996, when development costs decreased by 20 percent. The M51 entered service in 2010.

== Development ==
Comparison of different nuclear systems: left, the SNLE (Redoutable type) with the M4 missile; right, the SNLE-NG (Triomphant type) with the previous M45 missile and the current M51 missile

After having spent €5 billion ($6.7 billion) developing the missile, the French government placed a €3 billion ($3.9 billion) order with EADS SPACE Transportation for the M51 in December 2004. The contract covered serial production of the M51 for ten years, with the company to be responsible for sustained readiness support throughout the missile's life.

In 2014 Airbus signed a deal with the French government for development work on an upgrade designated M51.3 to equip the new ballistic missile submarines of the French Navy, SNLE 3G. On 10 May 2016 Airbus and Safran signed a joint partnership to develop the M51.3 upgrade intended to enter service around 2025.

M51.4: On August 28, 2025, the French Armaments Agency (DGA) awarded ArianeGroup the contract for the development and production of the fourth version (M51.4) of the M51 strategic ballistic missile.

== Testing ==
The M51 performed its first flight test (unarmed) on 9 November 2006 from the French missile flight test centre in Biscarrosse (Landes). The target was reached twenty minutes later, in the north-west of the Atlantic Ocean. A second and third successful test were carried out on 21 June 2007 and 13 November 2008.

On 27 January 2010, at 9h25, a missile was launched underwater by the French submarine Le Terrible, from Audierne Bay off the coast of Brittany in north-western France. The missile reached its target 2,000 kilometres (1,100 nmi) off South Carolina; the 4,500-kilometre (2,400 nmi) flight took less than 20 minutes. A 10 July 2010 test validated the Triomphant-class submarine's capacity to launch the M51 in operational conditions.

On 5 May 2013, an M51 flight test missile failed after being fired by a submerged ballistic missile submarine off the coast of Brittany. This was the first failed launch of the M51 after five successful launches since 2006. On 30 September 2015, an M51 was successfully test-flown from a land-based missile site near Biscarrosse to a desolate target in the North Atlantic.

On 12 June 2020, a successful test launch of a M51 missile was conducted from the Triomphant-class submarine Le Téméraire off the south-west tip of Finistère, Brittany. On 28 April 2021, the French Ministry of Armed Forces announced that it had tested an M51 missile. The test was not launched from a French Navy Triomphant-class submarine but from a land-based facility located in southwestern France. On 19 April 2023, Ministry of Armed Forces announced another M51 test launched from Le Terrible.

An M51.3 was test fired successfully in November 2023. It entered operational service in late 2025 with a reported operational range of 8,000 to 10,000 km, a speed of Mach 25 and improved accuracy and penetration capabilities. In September 2025, ArianeGroup was awarded a contract to design and produce the fourth version of the M51 submarine launched ballistic missile (SLBM) known as “M51.4”.

One of the possible reasons for the continued upgrades of the missile may be an analysis by the Royal United Services Institute, according to which Russian missile defenses may soon be able to intercept British and French nuclear weapons.

On 6 October 2026, an unarmed M51.3 was launched from Le Vigilant in the Atlantic Ocean, marking the first test to be carried out from a ballistic missile submarine, as previous tests launched from land sites. The test was attended by President Emmanuel Macron.

== Operators ==
France

- French Navy – Primary armament for the Triomphant-class submarines and the future SNLE 3G submarines.

== See also ==
- M45 (missile) – (France)
- R-29 Vysota – (Soviet Union)
- R-29RM Shtil – (Soviet Union)
- R-29RMU Sineva – (Russia)
- R-29RMU2 Layner – (Russia)
- RSM-56 Bulava – (Russia)
- UGM-133 Trident II – (United States)
- JL-2 – (China)
- JL-3 – (China)
- R-39 Rif – (Soviet Union)
- R-39M – (Russia)
