= M20 (missile) =

Submarine-launched ballistic missile

M20 SLBM
- Type: SLBM
- Place of origin: France

Service history
- In service: 1977–1991
- Used by: French Navy (French: Marine Nationale)

Production history
- Manufacturer: Aérospatiale, Space and Strategic Systems Division, Les Mureaux

Specifications
- Mass: 20,000 kg (44,000 lb)
- Length: 10.4 m (34 ft 1 in)
- Diameter: 1.5 m (4 ft 11 in)
- Maximum firing range: 3,000 km (1,900 mi)
- Filling: 1 × TN 60 or TN 61, with penetration aids
- Blast yield: 1.2 Mt (5.0 PJ)

The M20 was a French submarine-launched ballistic missile (SLBM) deployed on the nuclear Redoutable-class submarines from 1977. It was withdrawn from service by 1991. It was largely succeeded by the M4 and M45 missiles.

== History ==
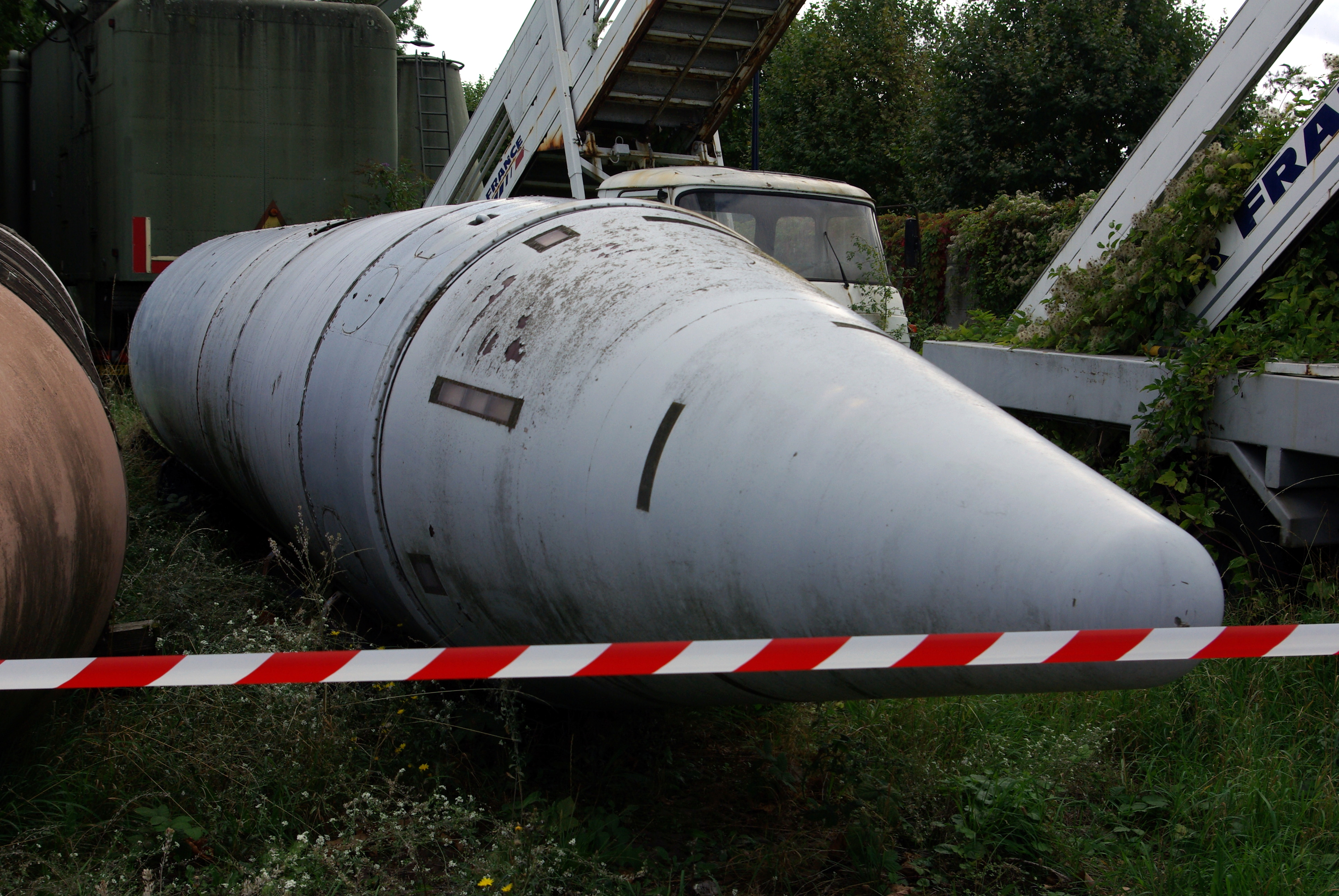
MSBS M20

The M20 was the third member of the MSBS (Mer-Sol-Balistique-Stratégique, "sea-ground ballistic strategic") family which comprised a number of submarine-launched, intermediate range missiles. The force constitutes the second leg of the French nuclear deterrent force.

The M1 version went into service in 1971 and was phased out in favour of the M2 in 1974, itself replaced by the M20 in 1977. The new M4 missile entered service in 1985 and has replaced the M-20. French nuclear-powered submarines (SNLE: Sous-marin Nucléaire Lanceur d'Engins, "Nuclear Device-Launching Submarine"), are able to carry 16 missiles each. The oldest ship, Redoutable, was not converted to carry the M-4 and was withdrawn from service in 1991. Logistical support for the MSBS fleet is provided by the Île Longue Naval Base in Brest Bay, where the assembly and storage facilities for maintenance of readiness are located. Three SSBNs are intended to be operational at any one time.

The M20 system entered service in 1977. There were 100 missiles produced, and the M20 ceased operational deployment in 1991.

== Technical ==
The M-20 was a two-stage, solid propellant, intermediate-range ballistic missile, 10.4 m in length and 1.5 m in diameter. Launch weight was 20,000 kg and the missile had a range of 3,000 km. Control of the first stage was by four gimballed nozzles; the second stage by thrust vector control through a single fixed nozzle. The first stage propellant weighed 10,000 kg and burned for 55 seconds, the second stage propellant weighed 6,015 kg and burned for 58 seconds. Guidance was inertial. The payload was believed to include some penetration aids and the single re-entry vehicle had some hardening against nuclear effects. The TN-60 warhead was reported to yield 1.2 Mt.

== Operators ==
France

- French Navy
