= TN 75 =

Thermonuclear warhead

The TN 75 is a French-built 150kt thermonuclear warhead used on France's M45 and M51 submarine-launched ballistic missiles, carried by the last of the Redoutable class submarines, S616 Inflexible, and by the Triomphant class submarines. The French Navy has 290 TN-75 warheads. It is a miniaturized, hardened and stealthy successor to the TN 71.

Development began in 1987 and developmental testing of the warhead ended in 1991, but French president Jacques Chirac asserted in June 1995 (50 years after the Atomic bombings of Hiroshima and Nagasaki) that a full yield proof weapons test was needed prior to deployment, causing an international outcry. Its first full-yield test was probably the 110 kt detonation on 1 October 1995 at Fangataufa.

It will be succeeded by the TNO, the Tête nucléaire océanique.

== See also ==
- Force de frappe
- Strategic Oceanic Force
- Nuclear tests by France
