= Redoutable-class submarine (1967) =

Nuclear-powered ballistic missile submarine built for the French Navy

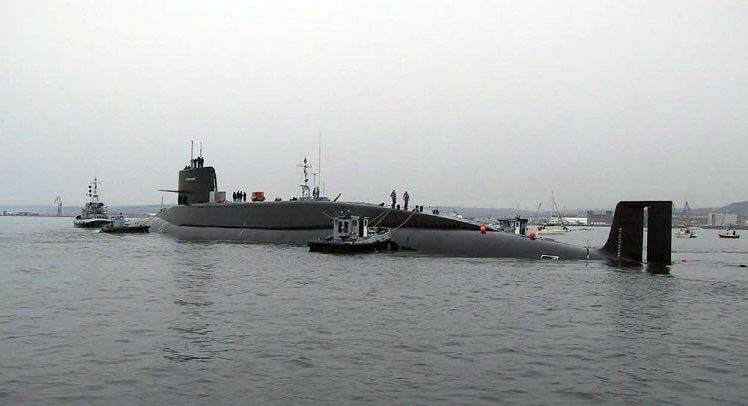
- Le Redoutable

Class overview
- Name: Le Redoutable class
- Builders: Arsenal de Cherbourg (DCAN)
- Operators: French Navy
- Preceded by: Gymnote
- Succeeded by: Le Triomphant class
- Built: 1964–1985
- In commission: 1971–2008
- Completed: 6
- Retired: 6
- Preserved: 1

General characteristics
- Type: Ballistic missile submarine
- Displacement: 8,000 tons (submerged)
- Length: 128 m (419 ft 11 in)
- Beam: 10.6 m (34 ft 9 in)
- Draught: 10 m (32 ft 10 in)
- Propulsion: One PWR; 16,000 shp (12,000 kW), HEU <= 90%
- Speed: Over 20 knots (37 km/h; 23 mph)
- Range: Unlimited distance; 20–25 years
- Complement: 15 officers; 120 sailors
- Sensors & processing systems: 1 DRUA 33; 1 DMUX 21; 1 DSUV 61B VLF; 1 DUUX 5; ARUR 12 radar detector
- Armament: 16 × M4 MSBS (Mer-Sol Balistique Stratégique) nuclear missiles; 4 × 533 mm (21 in) torpedo tubes; F-17 and L-5 torpedoes; SM-39 Exocet anti-ship missile

The Le Redoutable-class submarine was a ballistic missile submarine class of the French Navy (Marine Nationale). In French, the type is called Sous-marin Nucléaire Lanceur d'Engins (SNLE), literally "Missile-launching nuclear submarine". When commissioned, they constituted the strategic part of the naval component of the French nuclear triad, then called Force de frappe (the aircraft carriers Clemenceau and Foch constituting the tactical part).

The class entered active service in 1971 with Le Redoutable, six submarines were built in total. All have since been decommissioned. The structural changes in Inflexible have seen it regarded as a different class from the early boats. The class has been superseded by the Le Triomphant-class.

== Background ==
With the election of Charles de Gaulle as president of France, the French Armed Forces saw a change in direction. Under the new government, French forces were withdrawn from NATO formations due to French unhappiness with American domination of the group. Beginning in the 1960s, French foreign policy would be reshaped to create independence from both of the major opponents of the Cold War, the United States and the Soviet Union. This was later defined in the mantra "to deter – to intervene – to defend". From the foreign policy arose the concept of submarine-based "Force de Dissuassion", with emphasis on the "to deter", which was the focus of new French naval spending.

The new nuclear-powered, nuclear-armed submarine force was planned to be of similar size to the British Royal Navy. However, unlike the British, the French received no support from other nations and the French nuclear program began with a lack of technological expertise to draw from. Furthermore, the Americans refused to provide the French Navy with enriched uranium for the creation of a nuclear reactor. Nevertheless, the project was authorized in 1963. The French Navy resorted to working in conjunction with the civil French Alternative Energies and Atomic Energy Commission (French: Commissariat à l'énergie atomique et aux énergies alternatives), which the US allowed to acquire enriched uranium for experimental land use. A nuclear plant was constructed on land at Cadarache, and the reactor was tested to simulate nuclear-powered submarine patrols. Other developments made by the groups working on the project include the development of high-tensile steel by France and the adaptation of the submarine hull to nuclear propulsion.

At the same time as the French were developing nuclear propulsion, they were also researching ballistic missiles and nuclear warheads. Caissons were constructed to test fire missiles, and by 1967, the submarine Gymnote was fitted with the guidance and navigation systems to be tested. The first ballistic missile launch was at the Landes Trials Centre (French: Centre d'Essais des Landes) at the end of 1968 and nuclear warheads were tested at Moruroa in the Pacific Ocean.

== Description ==
Comparison of different nuclear systems: left, the SNLE (Le Redoutable type) with the M4 missile; right, the SNLE-NG Le Triomphant type) with the present M45 missile and the future M51 missile.

Designated Sous-marin Nucléaire Lanceur d'Engins (SNLE) literally "Missile-launching nuclear submarine", the design initially measured 128 metres (419 ft 11 in) long overall with a beam of 10.6 metres (34 ft 9 in) and a draught of 10 metres (32 ft 10 in). The submarines initially displaced 7,500 tonnes (7,400 long tons) surfaced and 9,000 tonnes (8,900 long tons) submerged. This later increased to 8,000 tonnes (7,900 long tons) surfaced. The submarines were powered by one pressurised water reactor providing steam to two turbines and two alternators and turning one propeller via a turbo reduction drive creating 12,100 kilowatts (16,200 hp). The submarines also sported electric emergency propulsion capable of providing a range of 5,000 nautical miles (9,300 km; 5,800 mi). The vessels could dive more than 200 metres (660 ft) and had a maximum speed of 20 knots (37 km/h; 23 mph). Each boat had two twin crews comprising 15 officers and 120 men.

=== Armament ===
The Le Redoutable class all have 16 compartments for submarine-launched ballistic missiles. Redoutable initially deployed with 16 the M1 MSBS (Mer-Sol Balistique Stratégique). The M1 missile was a two-stage ballistic missile with a 10.4 m (34 ft 1 in) height, and each missile weighed 18,000 kg (40,000 lb). The M1 had a 400-kiloton warhead and an approximate 2,500 km (1,600 mi) range. Terrible was also constructed to carry this missile. The design of Foudroyant was altered to carry the improved M2 MSBS missile in 1974. The M2 was heavier at 19,800 kg (43,700 lb), had a 500-kiloton warhead and a longer range than the M1. In 1977, both the M1 and M2 were replaced by the M20 MSBS.

== Vessels in class ==
Redoutable class construction data
Number	Name	Laid down	Launched	Completed	Fate	Notes
S611	Le Redoutable	30 March 1964	29 March 1967	1 December 1971	Stricken December 1991	Museum ship
S612	Le Terrible	24 June 1967	12 December 1969	1 January 1973	1996	
S610	Le Foudroyant	12 December 1969	4 December 1971	6 July 1974	1998	first M2 submarine
S613	L'Indomptable	4 December 1971	17 August 1974	23 December 1976	2003	
S614	Le Tonnant	October 1974	17 September 1977	3 April 1980	December 1999	
S615	L'Inflexible	27 March 1980	23 June 1982	1 April 1985	2008	first M4 submarine

== Service history ==
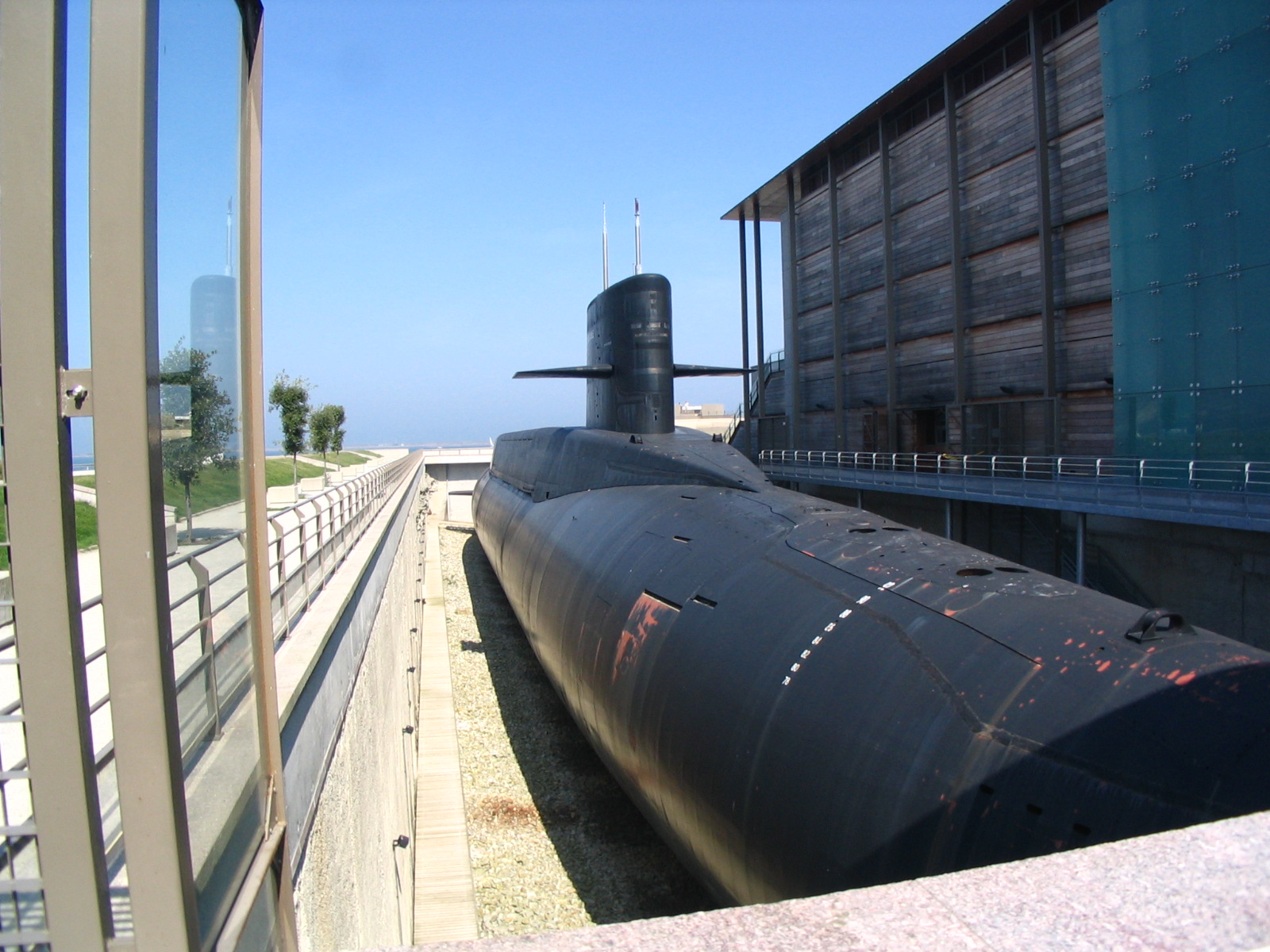
Le Redoutable in Cherbourg.

The first submarine, Le Redoutable, was ordered in 1963, built at Cherbourg, launched in 1967 and commissioned in 1971. The first submarine-launched ballistic missile version was replaced by the M2 MSBS beginning in 1974, which was in turn replaced by the M20 MSBS beginning in 1977. All except Le Redoutable were heavily upgraded from 1985 to fire the second generation MIRV capable M4 missile – Le Tonnant was recommissioned in 1987; L'Indomptable in 1989; Le Terrible in 1990; and Le Foudroyant in 1993.

== Decommissioning and disposal ==
Following a 2016 contract, all but Le Redoutable were to be dismantled at Cherbourg by Naval Group. The process included cutting the boats fore and aft of their reactors, and rewelding the shortened hulls in preparation for disposal of the non-nuclear portions of the vessels. It took 60–100 workers about 18 months from September 2018 to dismantle Le Tonnant in drydock, and it became the first of the class to be disposed of. The Direction générale de l'armement operations manager estimated that 87% of the mass of each vessel could be valuable as recycled material, including 1500 t of hull steel per boat.

Le Redoutable has been preserved since 2002 as a museum ship at the Cité de la Mer naval museum in Cherbourg-Octeville, France. The reactor compartment has been replaced by a new section that had been constructed for the cancelled Turquoise of the Rubis class.

== See also ==
- List of submarines of France
