= Tête nucléaire océanique =

French thermonuclear bomb warhead

The Tête nucléaire océanique (English: Oceanic nuclear warhead) or TNO is a French thermonuclear warhead designed to equip the M51 ballistic missiles on the Triomphant-class submarines. It has been in service since 2016, replacing the TN 75 warhead, originally designed for the M45, and which also equipped the M51, pending the development and service entry of the TNO.

Designed and produced by the CEA's Military Applications Division (DAM), TNO warheads are an integral part of France's nuclear deterrent program.

== Nuclear materials ==
As with all thermonuclear warheads, the explosive materials comprise three main elements: uranium, plutonium and tritium, all of which are of military grade. The highly enriched uranium-235 was produced at COGEMA's Tricastin Nuclear Site plant and the weapons-grade plutonium-239 at COGEMA's Marcoule Nuclear Site. Both were produced before France definitively ceased uranium and plutonium production in 1997, the country having sufficient stocks for its present and future needs. Tritium was produced in the Célestin I and II reactors at CEA's Marcoule plant.

== Yield ==
The TNO's yield (classified top secret) is, according to some sources, of the order of 100 kilotons of TNT (kt). The load used is said to be "robust": less optimized than the TN 75 (which has an estimated yield of 110 kt) but with improved reliability and service life. Its technology benefited from the final 1995–96 French nuclear tests campaign carried out at Moruroa, French Polynesia and its design was ultimately validated by the French nuclear defense simulation program carried out using the Laser Mégajoule, TERA-100 supercomputer and the Airix X-ray generator.

Since a French ballistic missile submarine is equipped with 16 M51 missiles, each carrying at least 6 warheads, the theoretical potential of a minimum salvo of 96 TNO (9,600 kt) would be equivalent to 640 Hiroshima atomic bombs (which had a power of around 15 kt).

== Reentry body ==
The TNO's reentry body, a conical outer shell with high-performance thermal protection, has been optimized for the M51 missile's performance, and in particular ensures atmospheric reentry on very long-range trajectories with the required precision. It also features advanced stealth characteristics.

== Classification of related data ==
The information presented in this article can only be indicative because underlying data is classified by the French government.

== See also ==
- Force de dissuasion
- Force océanique stratégique
- Nuclear tests by France
