= M2 (missile) =

Submarine-launched ballistic missile

M2 MSBS
- Type: SLBM

Service history
- In service: 1974-78

Specifications
- Mass: 19,500 kg (43,000 lb)
- Length: 10.67 m (35.0 ft)
- Diameter: 1.52 m (5 ft 0 in)
- Blast yield: 1 × nuclear warhead, 1,000 kt (4,200 TJ)
- Engine: Two-stage solid-fuel rocket 440 kN (99,000 lb_{f})
- Operational range: 3,200 km (2,000 mi)
- Guidance system: Inertial
- Launch platform: Redoutable-class SNLEs (SSBNs)

The M2 MSBS was the second French submarine-launched ballistic missile. In French, MSBS is the abbreviation for Mer-Sol Balistique Stratégique, or Sea-Ground Strategic Ballistic Missile. It has two stages. It was deployed on the Redoutable-class SNLEs (Sous-marin Nucléaire Lanceur d'Engins) (Device-launching Nuclear Submarine) or SSBNs from 1974 to 1978, replacing the M1 MSBS. The M2 was itself replaced by the M20 MSBS beginning in 1977.
