= M1 (missile) =

Submarine-launched ballistic missile

M1 MSBS
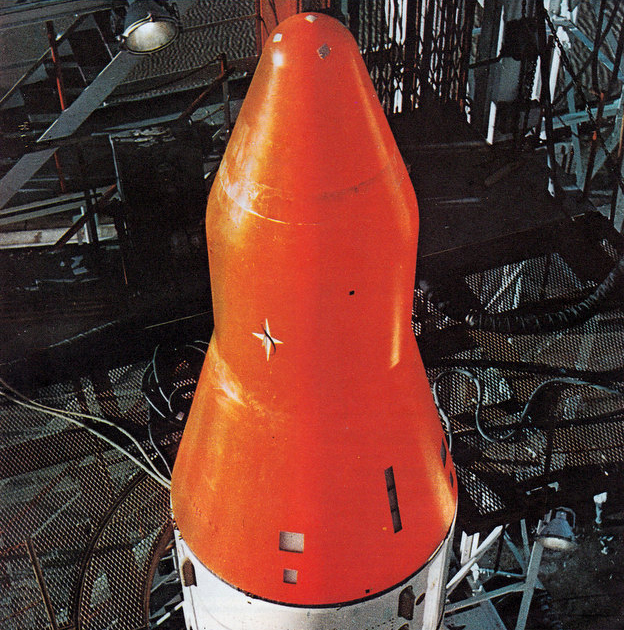
- Prototype of a re-entry vehicle of an M1 missile in 1969.
- Type: SLBM
- Place of origin: France

Service history
- In service: 1971-75

Production history
- Manufacturer: Aérospatiale

Specifications
- Mass: 20,005 kg (44,103 lb)
- Length: 10.67 m (35.0 ft)
- Diameter: 1.49 m (4 ft 11 in)
- Blast yield: 1 × 1,000 kt (4,200 TJ)
- Engine: Two-stage solid-fuel rocket 440 kN (99,000 lb_{f})
- Operational range: 3,000 km (1,900 mi)
- Guidance system: Inertial
- Launch platform: Redoutable-class SNLEs (SSBNs)

The M1 MSBS was the first French submarine-launched ballistic missile.

== Overview ==
In French, MSBS is the abbreviation for Mer-Sol Balistique Stratégique, or Sea-Ground Strategic Ballistic Missile. It has two stages. It was deployed on the Redoutable-class SNLEs (Sous-marin Nucléaire Lanceur d'Engins) (Device-launching Nuclear Submarine) or SSBNs from 1971 to 1975. It was replaced by the M2 MSBS in 1974–75.
