= Triomphant-class submarine =

French class of ballistic missile submarines

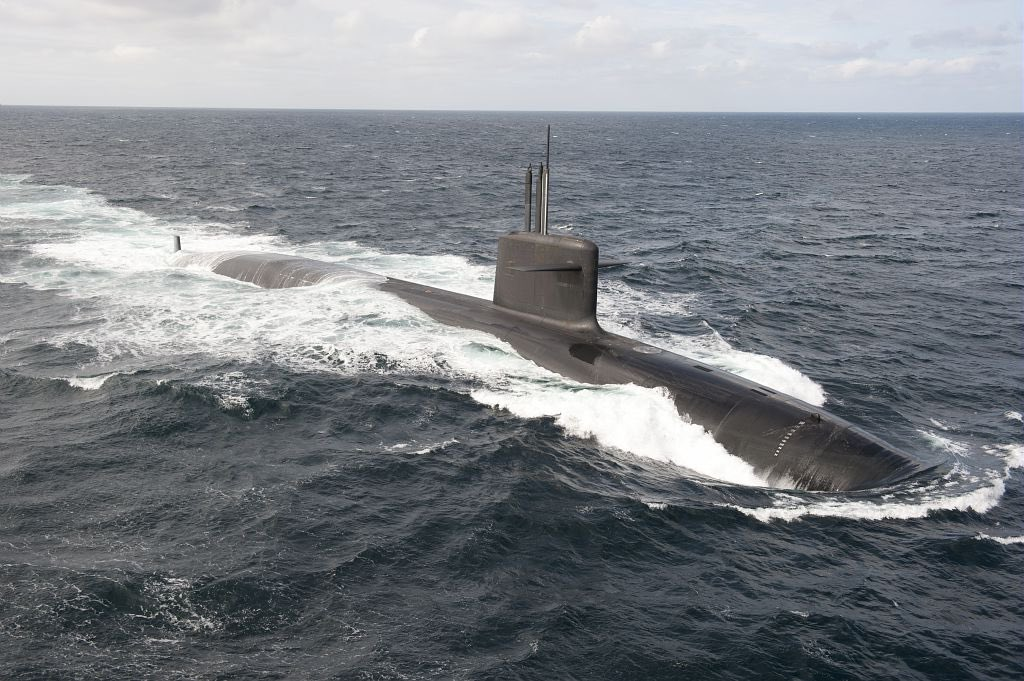
- Le Triomphant-class submarine

Class overview
- Name: Le Triomphant class
- Builders: DCNS
- Operators: French Navy
- Preceded by: Le Redoutable class
- Succeeded by: L'Invincible class
- Cost: €17.1 billion (2009) (equivalent to €22.2 billion in 2025) for 4 units; €3.1 billion (2009) (equivalent to €4 billion in 2025) for Le Terrible
- Built: 1986–2010
- In commission: 1997–present
- Planned: 4
- Completed: 4
- Active: 4

General characteristics
- Type: Ballistic missile submarine
- Displacement: 12,640 tonne (surfaced); 14,335 tonne (submerged)
- Length: 138 m (453 ft)
- Beam: 12.50 m (41.0 ft)
- Draught: 10.60 m (34.8 ft)
- Propulsion: K15 pressurized water reactor 150 MWth, LEU 7%; with turboreductor pump-to-shaft system of 30,5 MW; Power : 30,519 kW (40,927 hp); two emergency diesel-powered generators SEMT Pielstick 8PA4V200 SM (700 kW (940 hp)) auxiliaries.
- Speed: Over 25 kn (46 km/h)
- Range: Unlimited distance; 20–25 years
- Test depth: Over 400 m (1,300 ft)
- Complement: 15 officers; 96 sailors
- Sensors & processing systems: Sonar DMUX 80; Sonar DUUX 5; Sonar DSUV 61B Very Low Frequency; Racal Decca radar (navigation); SCC : SET (Système d'exploitation Tactique) : tactical operational system
- Electronic warfare & decoys: ARUR 13
- Armament: Nuclear: 16 M45 or M51/51.3 missiles with six to ten TN 75 150 kt or TNO 100-300 kt thermonuclear warheads; Four 533 mm (21 in) torpedo tubes for F17 torpedoes and; Exocet SM39 anti-ship missiles, launchable while submerged

The Le Triomphant-class submarine is a ballistic missile submarine class of the French Navy. It consists of four boats that entered service in 1997, 1999, 2004, and 2010. These four superseded the older Le Redoutable class, and they provide the ocean-based component (the Force océanique stratégique) of France's multi-discipline nuclear deterrent strike force, the Force de dissuasion ('deterrence force'). Their home port is Île Longue, Roadstead of Brest, Western Brittany.

== Design and construction ==
The first three boats were originally armed with the French-produced and armed M45 intermediate-range missile, and the fourth vessel, Le Terrible, tested and is equipped with the more advanced M51 missile. Each of the first three boats were retrofitted to the M51 missile standard, with the last M45 offloaded in 2016.

== Next Generation Device-Launching Nuclear Submarine ==
In French, these are called Sous-Marin Nucléaire Lanceur d'Engins de Nouvelle Génération 'Next Generation Device-Launching Nuclear Submarine' abbreviated as SNLE-NG. They have replaced all of the Le Redoutable class boats, with the last of those six boats being decommissioned in 2008. These submarines carry 16 submarine-launched ballistic missile launching tubes apiece.

This class reportedly produces approximately 1/1000 of the detectable noise of the Le Redoutable-class submarines, and they are ten times more sensitive in detecting other submarines. Initially armed with the M45 missile, they are designed to carry the new M51 missile, which entered active service in 2010. As of October 2010, an M51 has been test-fired from one of these submarines across the Atlantic Ocean from near France to the west, and is equipped on Le Terrible. In late 2025 it was reported that the M51.3 variant of the missile had entered operational service. The missile is said to have an operational range of 8,000 to 10,000 km, with a speed of Mach 25 also offering improved accuracy and penetration capabilities.

These boats were all constructed by the Direction des Constructions Navales, and they carry an armament of 16 M45 SLBM or M51 SLBM missiles manufactured by the Aérospatiale company (now ArianeGroup), plus conventional torpedoes and Exocet anti-ship missiles.

== List of submarines ==
The French Navy's goal is to operate a force of four ballistic missile submarines (comparable with the Royal Navy's Vanguard-class submarines), of which two are expected to be on patrol at any given time.

List of Triomphant-class submarines
| Name | Construction began | Launched | Commissioned |
|---|---|---|---|
| Le Triomphant | 9 June 1986 | 26 March 1994 | 21 March 1997 |
| Le Téméraire | 18 December 1993 | 21 January 1998 | 23 December 1999 |
| Le Vigilant | January 1996 | 19 September 2003 | 26 November 2004 |
| Le Terrible | 24 October 2000 | 21 March 2008 | 20 September 2010 |

== Service history ==
On 3 February or 4 February 2009, Le Triomphant collided with the Royal Navy submarine HMS Vanguard; the Royal Navy boat received damage to the outer casing in the area of the missile compartment on the starboard (right) side and suffered very visible dents and scrapes. Le Triomphant was reported to have proceeded to Brest under her own power, submerged, but with damage to her active sonar dome under her bow.

== Gallery ==
Comparison of different nuclear systems: left, the Le Redoutable type with the M4 missile; right, the Le Triomphant type with the M45 missile and the M51 missile.

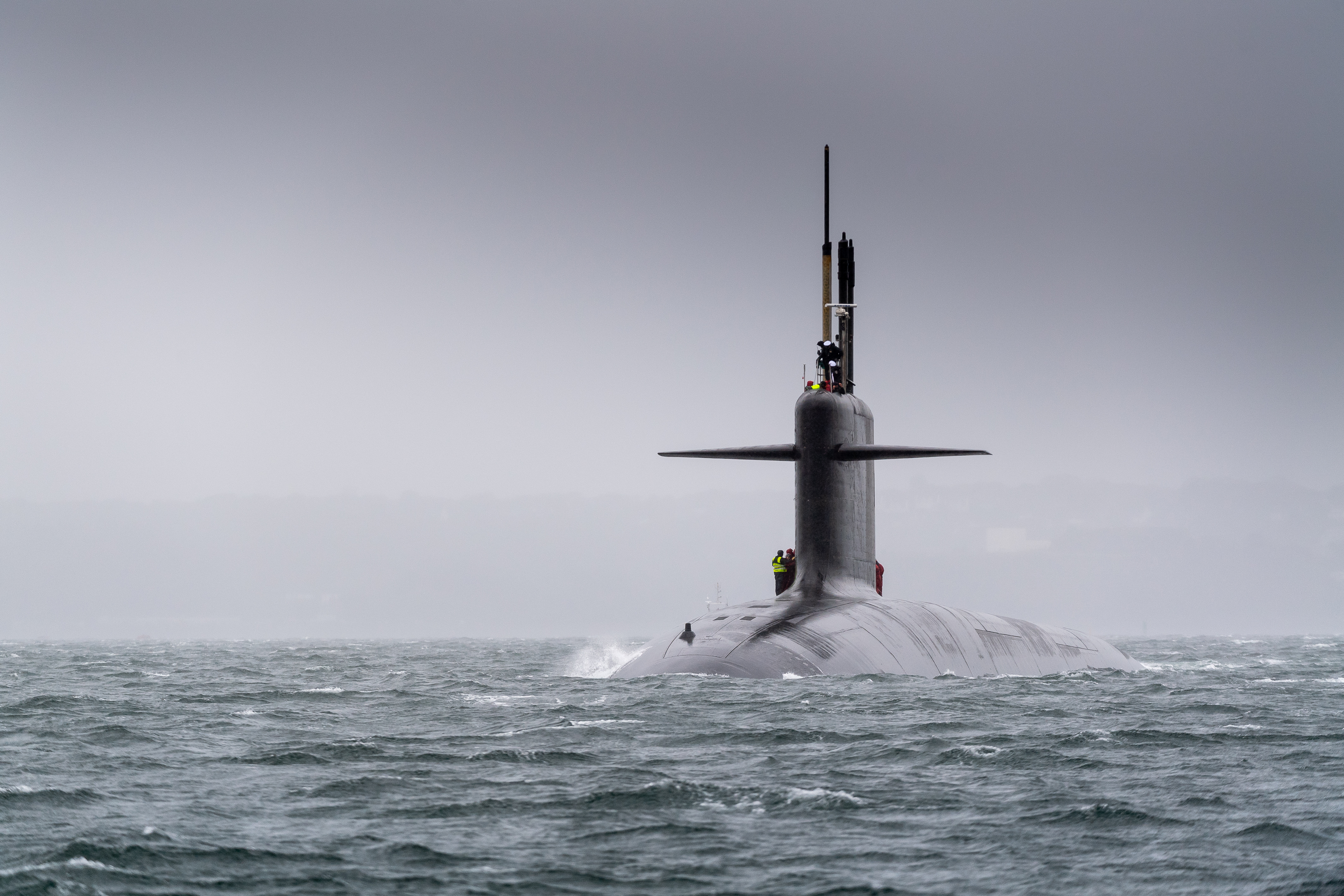
Le Triomphant

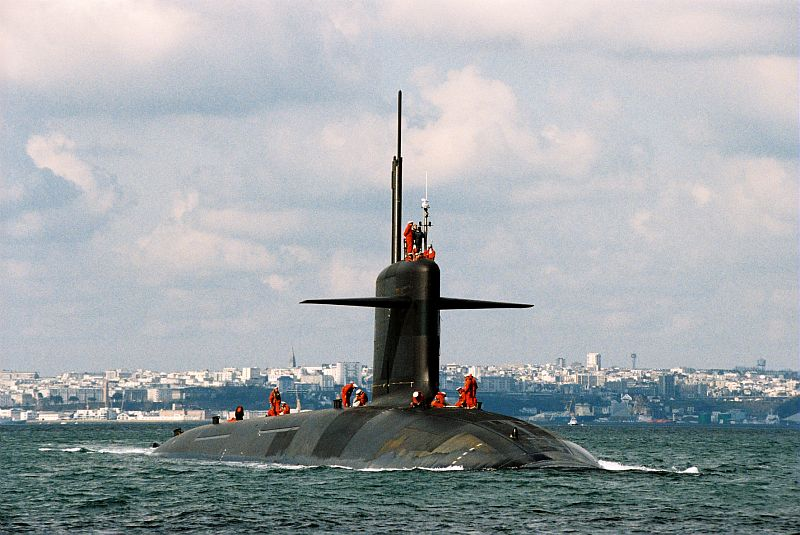
Le Vigilant

== See also ==
- List of submarines of France
- List of submarine classes in service
- Submarine forces (France)
- Future of the French Navy
- Submarine-launched ballistic missile
