= M45 (missile) =

Submarine-launched ballistic missile

M45 SLBM
- Type: SLBM

Service history
- In service: 1996–2016

Production history
- Manufacturer: Aérospatiale (1996–2000) now Astrium

Specifications
- Mass: 35 t
- Length: 11.05 m (36.3 ft)
- Diameter: 1.93 m (6.3 ft)
- Warhead: 6 x 110 kt TN 75
- Engine: 3-stage Solid-fuel rocket
- Operational range: 6,000 km (3,700 mi)
- Guidance system: Inertial plus computer payload control
- Launch platform: Triomphant-class submarines

The M45 SLBM was a French Navy submarine-launched ballistic missile (In French terminology, the MSBS - Mer-Sol-Ballistique-Stratégique (Sea-ground-Strategic ballistic missile).) Forty-eight M45 were in commission in the Force océanique stratégique, the submarine nuclear deterrent component of the French Navy. The missiles, derived from the M4, were produced by Aérospatiale (now Astrium). Initially, an ICBM land-based version was considered, but these plans were discarded in 1996 to favour an all-naval deployment.

The M45 differs from its predecessor by its increased range (6,000 km vs. 4,000 km), its increased accuracy and penetration capabilities and its new TN-75 warheads. Each missile carries six MIRVs, each armed with a thermonuclear warhead of 110 kt. The M45 has a reported accuracy of 350 m CEP using an inertial missile guidance system coupled with computer payload control. It was succeeded by the M51.

The Ministry of Defense had planned to replace the M45 model with the M51 model since 2004, but the last M45 was only removed from service in 2016. However, its successor, the M51 model, was formally introduced in 2010 and has since entered service. Throughout its service, only 64 out of the 192 missiles that were built are believed to have been used.

Comparison of different nuclear systems: left, the SNLE (Redoutable type) with the M4 missile; right, the SNLE-NG (Triomphant type) with the previous M45 missile and the current M51 missile.

== Tests ==
In March 1986, a M-4 missile was launched and covered 6,000 km to its target; this flight is rumoured to have been the first test flight for the M-45.

On the night of the 1–2 June 2004, the Triomphant-class submarine Vigilant fired a version of the M45 from the southern part of Brittany; the missile hit its target near French Guiana.

== Former operators ==
France

- French Navy - Original primary armament for the Triomphant-class SSBN. As of 2016, replaced by the M51 SLBM.

== See also ==
- M51 (missile) – (France)
- R-29 Vysota – (Soviet Union)
- R-29RM Shtil – (Soviet Union)
- R-29RMU Sineva – (Russia)
- R-29RMU2 Layner – (Russia)
- RSM-56 Bulava – (Russia)
- UGM-133 Trident II – (United States)
- JL-2 – (China)
- K-5
- Pukguksong-4
- Pukguksong-5 – (North Korea)
- R-39 Rif – (Soviet Union)
- R-39M – (Russia)
