= M4 (missile) =

Submarine-launched ballistic missile

M4 SLBM
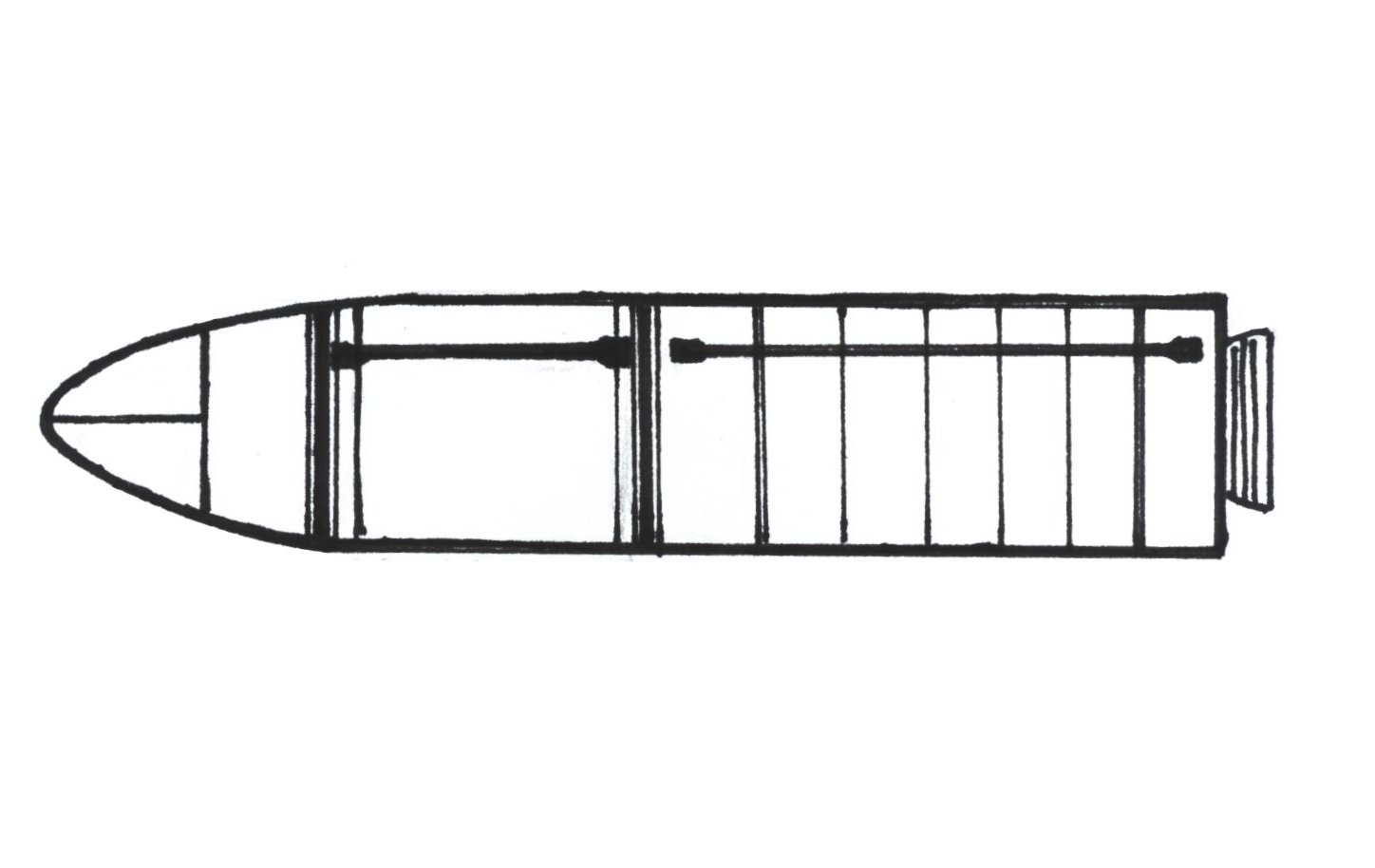
- Type: SLBM

Service history
- In service: 1985

Production history
- Manufacturer: EADS SPACE Transportation

Specifications
- Mass: 36,000 kg (79,000 lb)
- Length: 11.5 m (38 ft)
- Diameter: 1.93 m (6 ft 4 in)
- Warhead: 6 × TN 71 MIRV, with penetration aids
- Blast yield: 6 × 150 kt (630 TJ)
- Engine: Three stage Solid-fuel rocket
- Operational range: 5,000 km (3,100 mi)
- Guidance system: Inertial
- Launch platform: Redoutable-class submarines

The M4 was a French submarine-launched ballistic missile (SLBM) deployed on the nuclear Redoutable-class submarines (except the Redoutable herself, which was not refitted).

They entered service on 1 May 1985. They were the first French MIRV-capable nuclear missiles, with six 150 kilotonne warheads.

They were replaced by the improved M45 (missile) which was in service aboard the Triomphant-class submarine.

== Operators ==
France

- French Navy
