= List of nuclear submarines =

This is a list of nuclear-powered submarines.

== Current nuclear submarine classes ==
=== China ===
==== Nuclear-powered attack submarines ====
- Han class (Type 091)
- Shang class (Type 093)

==== Nuclear-powered ballistic missile submarines ====
- Jin class (Type 094)
- Xia class (Type 092)

==== Nuclear-powered cruise missile submarines ====
- Shang class (Type 093)

=== India ===
==== Nuclear-powered attack submarines ====
- Akula class (1 under lease)

==== Nuclear-powered ballistic missile submarines ====
- Arihant class

=== France ===
==== Nuclear-powered attack submarines ====
- Rubis class
- Suffren class

==== Nuclear-powered ballistic missile submarines ====
- Triomphant class

=== Russia ===
==== Nuclear-powered attack submarines ====
- Akula class (Project 971 Shchuka-B)
- Sierra class
  - Sierra II (Project 945A Kondor)
- Victor class
  - Victor III (Project 671RTM/RTMK Shchuka)

==== Nuclear-powered ballistic missile submarines ====
- Borei class
  - Borei (Project 955)
  - Borei-A (Project 955A)
- Delta class
  - Delta IV (Project 667BDRM Delfin)

==== Nuclear-powered cruise missile submarines ====
- Oscar class
  - Oscar II (Project 949A Antey)
- Yasen class
  - Yasen (Project 885)
  - Yasen-M (Project 885-M)

==== Nuclear-powered special purpose submarines ====
- Delta class
  - Delta III (Project 667BDR Kalmar)
  - Delta IV (Project 667BDRM Delfin)
- Oscar class
  - Oscar II (Project 949A Antey)

=== United Kingdom ===
==== Nuclear-powered attack submarines ====
- Astute class

==== Nuclear-powered ballistic missile submarines ====
- Vanguard class

=== United States ===
==== Nuclear-powered attack submarines ====
- Los Angeles class
  - Flight I
  - Flight II
  - Flight III
- Seawolf class
  - Seawolf subgroup
  - Jimmy Carter subgroup
- Virginia class
  - Block I
  - Block II
  - Block III
  - Block IV
  - Block V

==== Nuclear-powered ballistic missile submarines ====
- Ohio class (SSBN)

==== Nuclear-powered cruise missile submarines ====
- Ohio class (SSGN)

== Future nuclear submarine classes ==
=== Australia ===
==== Nuclear-powered attack submarines ====
- SSN-AUKUS
- Virginia class
  - Block IV
  - Block VII

=== Brazil ===
==== Nuclear-powered attack submarines ====
- Álvaro Alberto

=== China ===
==== Nuclear-powered attack submarines ====
- Sui class (Type 095)

==== Nuclear-powered ballistic missile submarines ====
- Tang (Type 096)

=== India ===
==== Nuclear-powered attack submarines ====
- Project 75 Alpha

=== France ===
==== Nuclear-powered ballistic missile submarines ====
- SNLE 3G

=== Russia ===
==== Nuclear-powered attack / cruise missile submarines ====
- Khabarovsk class (Project 09851)
- Laika class (Project 545 Laika)

=== United Kingdom ===
==== Nuclear-powered attack submarines ====
- SSN-AUKUS

==== Nuclear-powered ballistic missile submarines ====
- Dreadnought class

=== United states ===
==== Nuclear-powered attack submarines ====
- SSN(X) class
- Virginia class
  - Block VI
  - Block VII

==== Nuclear-powered ballistic missile submarines ====
- Columbia class

== Former nuclear submarine classes ==
=== France ===
==== Nuclear-powered ballistic missile submarines ====
- Redoutable class

=== Russia / USSR ===
==== Nuclear-powered anti-carrier submarines ====
- Echo class
  - Echo II (Project 675)

==== Nuclear-powered attack submarines ====
- Alfa class (Project 705 Lira)
- K-27 (Project 645)
- Mike class (Project-685 Plavnik)
- November class
  - November (Project 627)
  - November-A (Project 627A)
- Sierra class
  - Sierra I (Project 945 Barrakuda)
- Victor class
  - Victor I (Project 671 Yorsh)
  - Victor II (Project 671RT Syomga)

==== Nuclear-powered ballistic missile submarines ====
- Delta class
  - Delta I (Project 667B Murena)
  - Delta II (Project 667BD Murena-M)
  - Delta III (Project 667BDR Kalmar)
- Hotel class (Project 658)
- Typhoon class (Project 941 Akula)
- Yankee class (Project 658)

==== Nuclear-powered cruise missile submarines ====
- Charlie class
  - Charlie I (Project 670 Skat)
  - Charlie II (Project 670 Skat-M)
- Echo class
  - Echo I (Project 659)
- Papa class (Project 661 Anchar)
- Oscar class
  - Oscar I (Project 949 Granit)

=== United Kingdom ===
==== Nuclear-powered attack submarines ====
- Churchill class
- HMS Dreadnought (S101)
- Swiftsure class
- Valiant class
- Trafalgar class

==== Nuclear-powered ballistic missile submarines ====
- Resolution class

=== United States ===
==== Nuclear-powered attack submarines ====
- Skate class
- Skipjack class
- Permit class
- Sturgeon class (637 class)
- USS Glenard P. Lipscomb (SSN-685)
- USS Narwhal (SSN-671)
- USS Nautilus (SSN-571)
- USS Seawolf (SSN-575)
- USS Tullibee (SSN-597)

==== Nuclear-powered ballistic missile submarines ====
- George Washington class
- Ethan Allen class
- Lafayette class
- James Madison class
- Benjamin Franklin class

==== Nuclear-powered cruise missile submarines ====
- USS Halibut (SSGN-587)

== Nuclear submarines by name ==
=== A ===
- USS Alabama, SSBN-731
- USS Alaska, SSBN-732
- USS Albany, SSN-753
- USS Albuquerque, SSN-706
- USS Alexandria, SSN-757
- Álvaro Alberto, SN10
- HMS Ambush, S120
- S605 Améthyste
- USS Annapolis, SSN-760
- HMS Anson, S123
- INS Arighat
- INS Arihant (ATV-1), SSBN-S02
- HMS Artful, S121
- USS Asheville, SSN-758
- Astute class (SSN)
- HMS Astute, S119
- HMS Audacious, S122
- USS Augusta, SSN-710

=== B ===
- USS Benjamin Franklin, SSBN-640
- USS Bluefish, SSN-675
- USS Boise, SSN-764
- Borei class
- USS Boston, SSN-703
- USS Bremerton, SSN-698
- K-117 Bryansk
- USS Buffalo, SSN-715

=== C ===
- S603 Casabianca (ex-Bourgogne), SNA (SSN)
- INS Chakra
- USS Charlotte, SSN-766
- USS Cheyenne, SSN-773
- USS Chicago, SSN-721
- Churchill class (SSN)
- HMS Churchill, S46
- USS City of Corpus Christi, SSN-705
- USS Colorado, SSN-788
- USS Columbia, SSN-771
- USS Columbus, SSN-762
- USS Connecticut, SSN-22
- HMS Conqueror, S48
- HMS Courageous, S50
- China SSN sub classes - 091 (Han), 093 (Shang), 095 (SSGN), 097 (Qin)
- China SSBN sub classes - 092 (Xia), 094 (Jin), 096 (Tang), new-type 098 fourth-generation strategic nuclear submarine

=== D ===
- USS Dallas, SSN-700
- K-414 Daniil Moskovsky
- Delta class
- RFS Dmitriy Donskoy, TK-208 (SSBN)
- HMS Dreadnought, S101

=== E ===
- S604 Émeraude, SNA (SSN)

=== F ===
- USS Florida, SSGN-728

=== G ===
- USS Georgia, SSGN-729
- USS Greeneville, SSN-772
- USS Greenling, SSN-614

=== H ===
- USS Hampton, SSN-767
- USS Hartford, SSN-768
- USS Hawaii, SSN-776
- USS Hawkbill, SSN-666
- USS Helena, SSN-725
- USS Henry M. Jackson, SSBN-730 (former USS Rhode Island)
- USS Honolulu, SSN-718
- USS Houston, SSN-713
- USS Hyman G. Rickover, SSN-709

=== I ===
- S615 L'Inflexible, SNLE (SSBN)
- USS Indiana, SSN-789

=== J ===
- USS Jacksonville, SSN-699
- USS Jefferson City, SSN-759
- USS Jimmy Carter, SSN-23
- USS James Monroe, SSBN-622

=== K ===
- USS Kentucky, SSBN-737
- USS Key West, SSN-722
- K-278 Komsomolets
- B-276 Kostroma
- Soviet submarine K-8
- Soviet submarine K-19
- Soviet submarine K-27
- Soviet submarine K-43, Also leased to India as INS Chakra between 1988 and 1991
- Soviet submarine K-56
- Soviet submarine K-131
- Soviet submarine K-219
- Soviet submarine K-429

=== L ===
- USS La Jolla, SSN-701
- K-3 Leninsky Komsomol
- USS Los Angeles, SSN-688
- USS Louisiana, SSBN-743
- USS Louisville, SSN-724

=== M ===
- USS Maine, SSBN-741
- USS Maryland, SSBN-738
- USS Memphis, SSN-691
- USS Miami, SSN-755
- USS Michigan, SSGN-727
- USS Minneapolis-Saint Paul, SSN-708
- USS Montpelier, SSN-765

=== N ===
- USS Nautilus. SSN-571
- USS Nebraska, SSBN-739
- K-152 Nerpa
- USS Nevada, SSBN-733
- USS New Hampshire, SSN-778
- USS Newport News, SSN-750
- USS Norfolk, SSN-714
- USS North Carolina, SSN-777
- USS North Dakota, SSN-784
- K-407 Novomoskovsk

=== O ===
- USS Ohio, SSGN-726
- USS Oklahoma City, SSN-723
- USS Olympia, SSN-717
- USS Omaha, SSN-692
- Oscar class

=== P ===
- USS Pasadena, SSN-752
- USS Pennsylvania, SSBN-735
- S606 Perle, SNA (SSN)
- K-211 Petropavlovsk-Kamchatskiy
- USS Philadelphia, SSN-690
- USS Pittsburgh, SSN-720
- BS-64 Podmoskovye
- USS Portsmouth, SSN-707
- USS Providence, SSN-719
- K-336 Pskov

=== R ===
- S611 Redoutable, SNLE (SSBN)
- HMS Renown, S26
- HMS Repulse, S23
- Resolution class (SSBN)
- HMS Resolution, S22
- HMS Revenge, S27
- USS Rhode Island, SSBN-740
- S601 Rubis (ex-Provence), SNA (SSN)

=== S ===
- USS Salt Lake City, SSN-716
- USS Sam Houston, SSBN-609
- USS San Francisco, SSN-711
- USS San Juan, SSN-751
- USS Santa Fe, SSN-763
- S601 Saphir (ex-Bretagne), SNA (SSN)
- HMS Sceptre, S104
- USS Scranton, SSN-756
- USS Seahorse, SSN-669
- USS Seawolf, SSN-21
- Sierra class
- USS Simon Bolivar, SSBN-641
- HMS Sovereign, S108
- HMS Spartan, S105
- HMS Splendid, S106
- USS Springfield, SSN-761
- HMS Superb, S109
- K-433 Svyatoy Georgiy Pobedonosets
- Swiftsure class (SSN)
- HMS Swiftsure, S126

=== T ===
- HMS Talent, S92
- S617 Téméraire, SNLE (SSBN)
- USS Tennessee, SSBN-734
- USS Texas, SSN-775
- HMS Tireless, S88
- USS Toledo, SSN-769
- USS Topeka, SSN-754
- HMS Torbay, S90
- Trafalgar class (SSN)
- HMS Trafalgar, S107
- HMS Trenchant, S91
- S616 Triomphant, SNLE (SSBN)
- USS Triton SSRN/SSN-586
- HMS Triumph, S93
- USS Tucson, SSN-770
- HMS Turbulent, S87
- Typhoon class

=== V ===
- Valiant class (SSN)
- HMS Valiant, S102 (SSN)
- Vanguard class (SSBN)
- HMS Vanguard, S28 (SSBN)
- HMS Vengeance, S31 (SSBN)
- K-157 Vepr
- Victor class
- HMS Victorious, S29 (SSBN)
- HMS Vigilant, S30 (SSBN)
- S618 Vigilant, SNLE (SSBN)
- K-456 Vilyuchinsk
- USS Virginia, SSN-774

=== W ===
- HMS Warspite, S103 (SSN)
- USS West Virginia, SSBN-736
- USS Wyoming, SSBN-742

=== Y ===
- Yury Dolgorukiy
- Yasen class
