= Submarine forces (France) =

Submarine branch of the French Navy

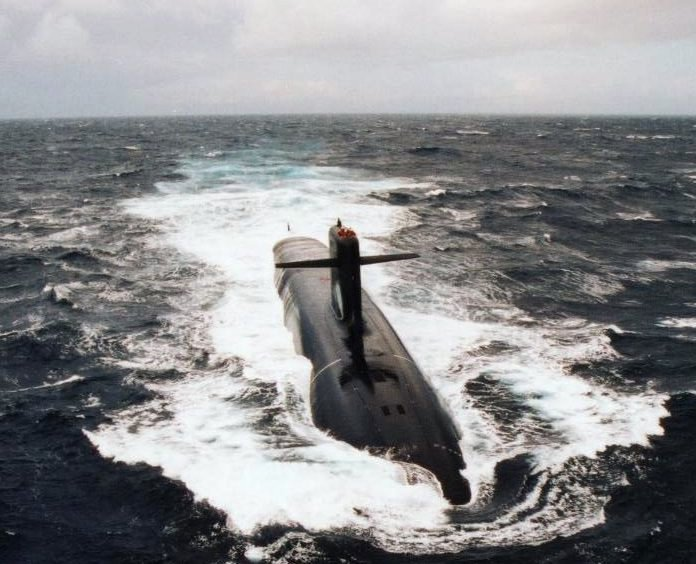
The Triomphant-class Le Téméraire

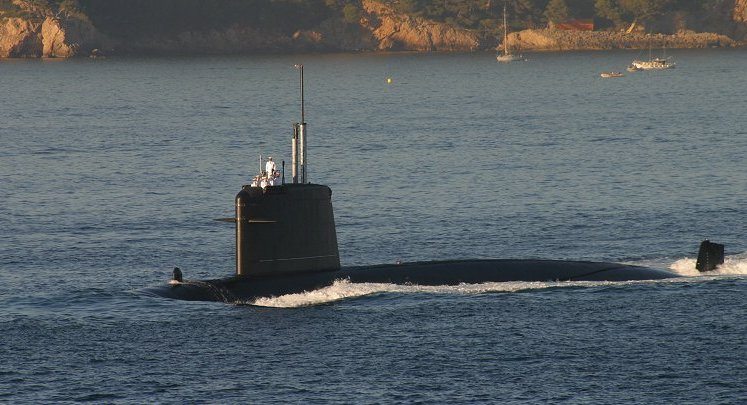
The Rubis-class Saphir

The Submarine Forces of France (French: Forces sous-marines, pronounced [fɔʁs su maʁin], FSM) are one of the four main components of the French Navy. The force oversees all French submarines regardless of role.

The headquarters staff is an independent command made up of two prime components:

- The Strategic Oceanic Force (French: Force Océanique Stratégique, FOST), comprising several French nuclear ballistic missile submarine based at Brest. These forces are under the command of an Admiral, with the command structure, which commenced in 1972, being known as ALFOST.
- The Squadron of Nuclear Attack Submarines (French: Escadrille des Sous-Marins Nucléaires d'Attaque, ESNA), comprising a squadron of several attack submarines based at Toulon.

French submarine forces comprise over 4,000 military and civilian personnel of which an estimated two thousand are submariners.

The French General Naval Officer (French: L'Officier général de marine), the Amiral (Admiral) Commandant of the Strategic Oceanic Force (French: Commandant la Force Océanique Stratégique, ALFOST), commands the submarine forces, under the authority of the Chief of Staff of the French Navy (French: Chef d'Etat-Major de La Marine).

== History of French submarine forces ==
=== Origin ===
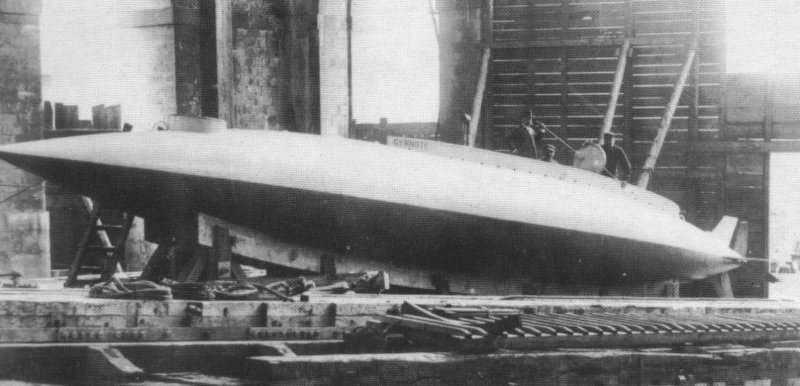
Gymnote, launched in 1888, was the first all electric submarine equipped with batteries. Her crew was five men.

The first submarine not to use human propulsion was French submarine Plongeur (2) of the French Imperial Navy (French: Marine Impériale Française), was launched in 1863, and was equipped with a compressed-air motor, supplied by twenty-three tanks of compressed air pressurised to 180 psi (1,200 kPa).

In 1888, Gymnote was the first submarine equipped with metal batteries, in this case consisting of zinc and copper oxide electrodes. Gymnote would be followed by Morse in 1899 and then the Farfadet-class series in 1901. Their range was 100 miles (160 km).

In June 1900, Narval introduced a double hull, with an internal hull outside the pressure hull. During this period, France was the first navy to have a substantial submarine force. These 200-ton submarines had a range of over 100 nmi (190 km; 120 mi) surfaced and 10 nmi (19 km; 12 mi) submerged. Aigrette, launched 1904, offered further improvement by running a diesel motor while surfaced. Seventy-six submarines were completed by 1914.

=== First World War ===
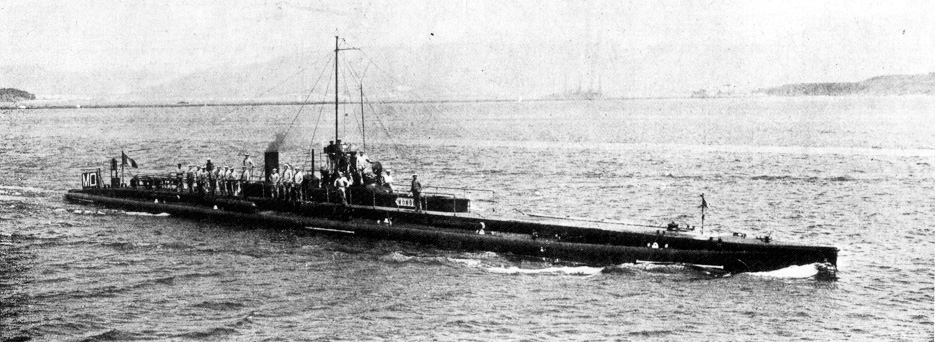
Monge was sunk on 28 December 1915.

At the beginning of World War I in August 1914, the French Navy fielded 72 submarines essentially to defend her coastlines, of which 50 units were at sea. During the conflict orders were placed for a further 90 with almost 70 launched by 1918. Fifty-nine of these boats conducted more than 1,300 sorties, fourteen of those were lost in the conflict (twelve in the Mediterranean). Among the boats lost were Curie which was scuttled during a tentative attack on the base of Pula in December 1914, and would be refitted by the Austro-Hungarian Navy and Foucault, sunk in a bombardment by flying boats of the Austro-Hungarian Navy at the naval base of Kotor on 15 September 1915, was the first submarine to be sunk in an aerial attack.

At the end of the war, France received 46 U-boats from the Imperial German Navy in reparations but most were scrapped between 1922 and 1923 following the signature of the Washington Naval Treaty.

=== Interwar period ===
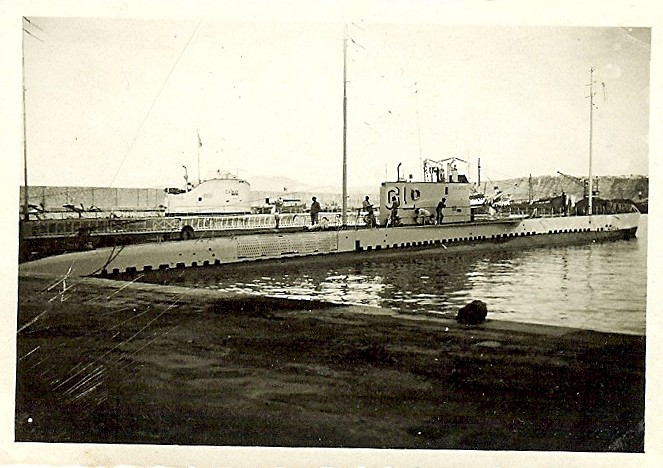
Galatée of the Sirène class docked at the port of Oran in 1933. Calypso of the Circé class in the background.

In 1922, French submarine forces counted 48 boats, all constructed after 1911. On 1 January 1930, France had the most powerful submarine fleet in the world with 110 units totaling 97,875 tons in service, construction or in authorized commission. However, the French naval construction witnessed set-backs in perfecting the submarines production (certain setbacks were witnessed as the level of maintenance for instance) and were classified as various initiatives, categorizing the submarines on a general scale while sharing the same characteristics (same dimensions, displacement, armament and other features). In any case, the French differentiated their submarines by their displacement: 600–, 1100–, and 1500-ton types. Accordingly, several classes of submarines were constructed for the years 1921–1931, out of which the most prominent were:

- Requin class, first class submarine (grand patroller).
- Redoutable class 1500-ton type, first class submarine (grand patroller).
- 600-630-ton type, consisting of several series.
- Minerve class
- Surcouf, cruiser submarine.

=== Second World War ===
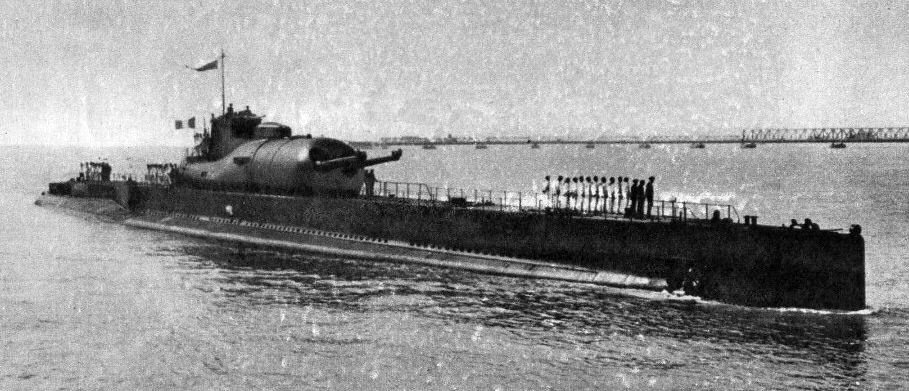
Surcouf, a cruiser submarine in the 1930s.

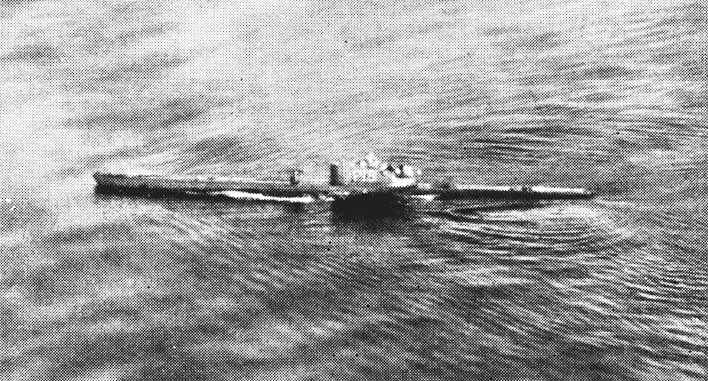
On 25 August 1941, protected by warplanes of the Royal Air Force, Rubis making way at sea following a naval engagement.

At the declaration of World War II in September 1939, France had 77 submarines out of which 47 had been launched in the previous ten years and 19 submarines under construction. A submarine depot ship, the Jules Verne, had been in service since April 1932. The French Navy had nine submarines of the 1200 tons type, 29 units of the 1500 tons type (Prométhée and Phénix had been lost accidentally in 1932 and 1939); 38 vessels of the 600 tons type (Ondine was lost in 1928 and Nymphe was condemned in 1938) plus six minelaying submarines of the Saphir class and the cruiser submarine Surcouf, which displaced 3,300 tons, being the largest submarine in the world at that time.

At the Armistice of 22 June 1940, 602 type 550mm and 187 type 400mm torpedoes along with 332 naval mine types were available in a French port and elsewhere in French possessions.

Following the defeat during the Battle of France, only three submarines joined the Free French Naval Forces in 1940, Rubis, Narval (sunk by a naval mine on 21 December 1940), and Surcouf (sunk accidentally or by misunderstanding during the night of 18 and 19 February 1942).

One submarine was sunk during the Norwegian Campaign and subsequently several French submarines under the command of the Vichy government were sunk or damaged by the Allies in various combats taking place in the French colonial empire. During the Battle of Dakar in September 1940 two submarines of the Vichy regime were sunk but Bévéziers damaged a battleship. Three submarines including Béveziers, were lost in May 1942 during the Battle of Madagascar. During the Scuttling of the French fleet in Toulon five submarines, including Casabianca managed to exit the base at Toulon.

The attack summary of French submarine torpedoes during the Second World War was:

- 1939 : no attacks.
- January to May 1940 : 4 attacks, 9 torpedoes launched all missed.
- June 1940 – 1942 :
  - Free French Naval Forces (FNFL): 8 attacks, 13 torpedoes launched, 6 missed targets, 2 ships sunk.
  - Vichy : 14 attacks, 37 torpedoes launched, 1 target sunk, 1 target damaged.
- 1943 : 11 attacks, 33 torpedoes launched, 3 targets sunk, 1 target damaged.
- 1944 : 16 attacks, 36 torpedoes launched, 2 targets sunk.

The submarines undertook numerous unconventional operations including dropping agents, forces of the resistance and materials in occupied Europe and the Casabianca played an important role in the liberation of Corsica by transporting special forces personnel. On 1 January 1945, France had eight submarines of the first class, twenty submarines of the second class of which four were lent by the United Kingdom, one minelaying submarine and one depot ship for submarines. On 8 May 1945, nineteen vessels were in active service of which nine were operational (three lent by the United Kingdom). On 1 January 1946 the personnel were reduced to 700 men.

=== Post-war ===
Following the German surrender, France received a total of eighty-five former German vessels, which included six combat submarines, four midget submarines (in service until 1954) as well as an Italian coastal submarine. Only four out of them were placed on permanent active duty, with the French Navy including Roland Morillot which was in service until 1967.

The reconstruction phase started with research at the end of the conflict including assimilating the advanced techniques and tactics of World War II. Five submarines of the Aurore class whose construction was interrupted in 1940 were commissioned and served into the 1960s.

=== Conventional attack submarine ===
During the years 1970/1980, the diesel submarines were spread in the Submarines Squadron of the Atlantic (ESMAT) and the Submarines Squadron of the Mediterranean (ESMED). In 1995, the remaining ESMA was dissolved with the last submarine leaving port on 11 February 1997. The four Agosta and the two last Daphné class were part of the Submarines Atlantic Group (GESMAT), created in 1995. The latter was in turn decommissioned on 1 July 1999 and the two ultimate Agosta-class vessels, La Praya and L'Ouessant, integrated the FOSt until their retirement.

Since 1970, the French submarine fleet consisted of:

- Four Aréthuse class placed into service between 1958 and 1960.
- Six Narval class placed into service between 1957 and 1960.
- Nine Daphné class placed into service between 1964 and 1969.
- Various other submarine classes.

On 1 November 1970, the 1st squadron, numbering 11 units, were designated as Submarines Squadron of the Mediterranean (ESMM, then ESMED) and the 2nd squadron created in 1947 which comprised eight vessels, six of Narval class and two of the Daphné class, became the Submarine Squadron of the Atlantic (ESMA, then ESMAT). Four Agosta-class vessels were placed into service in 1977 and 1978 with retirement in 2001.

=== Nuclear era ===
On 28 January 1972, the first ballistic missile submarine of the Redoutable class left a submarine base for the first nuclear deterrence patrol. With the creation of FOST, the submarine force was subordinated to support it in the role of nuclear deterrence.

==== French nuclear attack submarines ====
With the commissioning of French nuclear ballistic missile submarine in the French Navy in 1970, it was decided to construct the Rubis class of French nuclear attack submarines. Going through several designations, the nuclear-powered submarines was eventually designated the Provence class ( with the next two vessels being designated as Bretagne and Bourgogne), before being christened under the Presidency of Valéry Giscard d'Estaing. These were one of the most compact nuclear attack submarines in the world with reactor integration. Built since 1976, the first was delivered in 1983. Six entered service in total, the last in 1993. Their nuclear propulsion and speed allows the submarines to be dispatched with total secrecy to the Mediterranean, Occidental Africa, the Antilles, the Persian Gulf, the Pacific Ocean, and other oceans and seas.

Occupied mainly, but not exclusively by operations of anti-submarine warfare at the profit of deterrence, since the creation of the Strategic Oceanic Force, the employment scope range of the attack submarines was enlarged since the middle of the years of 1990 with the leveling placement of nuclear attack submarines which can act at the profit of Carrier battle groups and maritime action.

The six French nuclear attack submarines of the Rubis class are being replaced by the Barracuda class beginning in 2020. The Rubis class were the main class of nuclear attack submarines in service following the retirement of the last conventional propulsion submarines in 2001. The Squadron of Nuclear Attack Submarines (ESNA) is a component of the Strategic Oceanic Force which assimilated the Submarine Forces at the end of the 20th century.

- Rubis class
  1. Rubis (S601) (1983–2022)
  2. Saphir (S602) (1984–2019)
  3. Casabianca (S603) (1987–2023)
  4. Émeraude (S604) (1988–2024)
  5. Améthyste (S605) (1992– )
  6. Perle (S606) (1993–2026)
- Suffren class
  1. Suffren (S635) (2020– )
  2. Duguay-Trouin (S636) (2023–)
  3. Tourville (S637) (2024–)
  4. De Grasse (S638) (delivered 2026 and working up to full operational capability)
  5. Rubis
  6. Casabianca

==== French nuclear ballistic missile submarines ====
Six French nuclear ballistic missile submarines of the Le Redoutable class capable of carrying sixteen ballistic missiles were built:

- Le Redoutable (1971–1991)
- Le Terrible (1973–1996)
- Le Foudroyant (1974–1998)
- L'Indomptable (1976–2003)
- Le Tonnant (1980–1999)
- L'Inflexible (1985–2008)

Four French nuclear ballistic missile submarines of a newer generation, the Le Triomphant class, are in service in 2010 in the force océanique stratégique of the French Navy:

- Le Triomphant (S616) (entered in service since 1997)
- Le Téméraire (S617) (entered into service since 1999)
- Le Vigilant (S618) (entered into service since 2004)
- Le Terrible (S619) (entered into service since 2010). Le Terrible was presented on 21 March 2008, and entered service at the end of September 2010 to replace L'Inflexible, last of the retrieved Le Redoutable-class ballistic missile submarine in 2008.

A successor SSBN class (the SNLE 3G ballistic missile submarines) began construction in 2024 with a view to commencing service entry in the mid-2030s.

The armament systems of the ballistic missile submarines include in general:

- 16 missiles M45 with TN 75 heads (nuclear deterrence). French nuclear deterrence also includes M51 missiles.
- 4 tubes of 533 mm for F17 torpedoes and Exocet SM39 anti-ship missiles.

The mission of a French nuclear ballistic missile submarine is simple: leave the designated port of attachment, in the most discreet possible way, remain undetectable all along the mission to be able at any moment launch a nuclear strike, under orders of the president of France.

== See also ==
- Chef d'État-Major des Armées
- Major (France)
- French Navy
  - French Naval Aviation
  - List of Escorteurs of the French Navy
  - List of submarines of France
- French Air Force
  - Strategic Air Forces Command
