= Pierre-François Forissier =

French admiral (born 1951)

Pierre-François Forissier

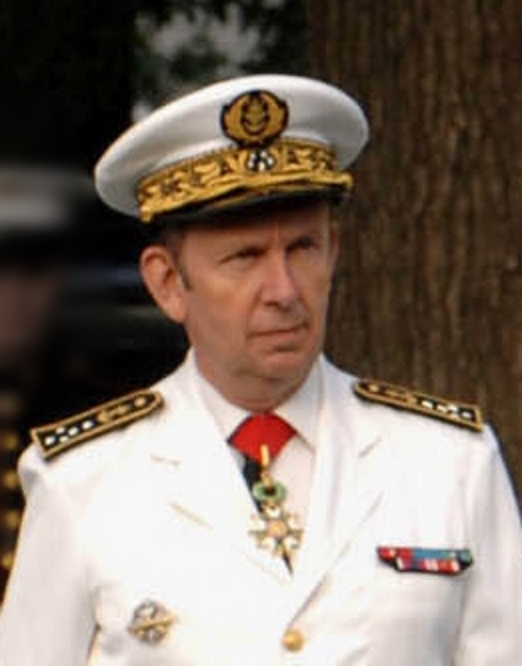
- Admiral Forissier in 2008
- Born: 29 December 1951 (age 74); Lorient, France
- Allegiance: France
- Branch: French Navy
- Service years: 1971–2011
- Rank: Amiral
- Commands: SNA Rubis; SNLE Tonnant; FSM; FOST; Major général de la Marine (2005–2008); CEMM (2008–2011)

Pierre-François Forissier (French pronunciation: [pjɛʁfʁɑ̃swa fɔʁisje]; born 29 December 1951) is a retired admiral and submariner in the French Navy who served as Chief of Staff of the French Navy from 4 February 2008 to 12 September 2011.

== Biography ==
After studying his secondary education in Nice, Marseille and Toulon, he then attended a Lycée naval at Brest (1968–1971).

He married Brigitte Desbrest on 24 June 1978 at Bonnetan, and have four children.

=== Military career ===
Pierre-François entered the École Navale (1971–1974). Upon completing his chartered course, he graduated as an enseigne de vaisseau de première classe and rallied to the French Submarine Forces FSM in 1975. He served on all types of operational submarines, notably commanding the nuclear attack submarine SNA Rubis and the ballistic missile submarine SNLE Tonnant.

In 1974, he served on the 20th minesweepers surface division and the minesweeper Glycine as second officer in command, then in 1990 as a manoeuvring-officer of the carrier Foch.

In 1993, he was designated as second in command of the Brest Naval Training Centre.

He served also at the general staff headquarters of the French Navy (French: état-major de la marine) in the « Material » division, the a couple years later in the « Plans » division and was promoted to Contre-Amiral (Counter-Admiral) in 2001.

He then occupied the functions of territorial assistant (French: adjoint) to the commandant of the coded maritime region « Atlantic ».

Vice-Amiral (Vice-Admiral), he commanded the Submarines Forces FSM and Force Océanique Stratégique FOST before being designated as a Vice-Amiral d'Escadre (Squadron Vice-Admiral) deputy in 2005 at the post of Major Général de La Marine (French: major général de la marine).

On November 4, 2008, he was elevated to the rank of Amiral (Admiral) and designated as Chief of Staff of the French Navy (French: Chef d'état-major de la Marine). He left that command function on September 12, 2011 and was replaced by Amiral Bernard Rogel.

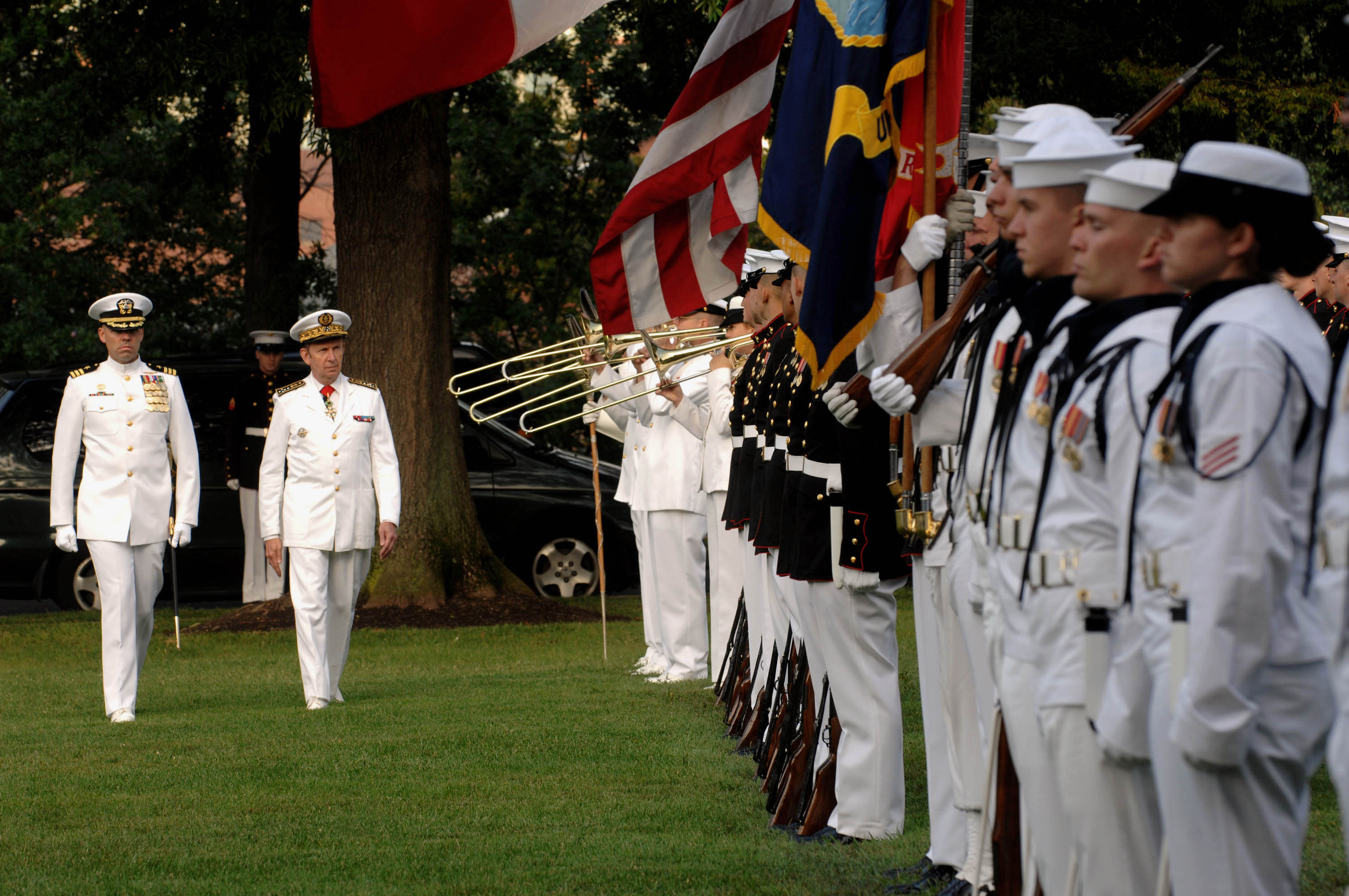
Official Admiral's visit to the U.S.

== Decorations and medals ==

- Grand Officer of the Order of the Legion of Honour
- Knight of the National Order of Merit
- Commander of the Order of Maritime Merit
- Medaille de la Défense Nationale (silver echelon)
- Gold Honor Cross of the Bundeswehr (Germany)
- Commander of the Legion of Merit (United States)
- Grand Cross with Swords pro Merito Melitensi (Order of Malta)
- Grand Officer of the Order of Naval Merit (Brazil)
- Grand Cross of the Order of Rio Branco (Brazil)

== Gallery ==
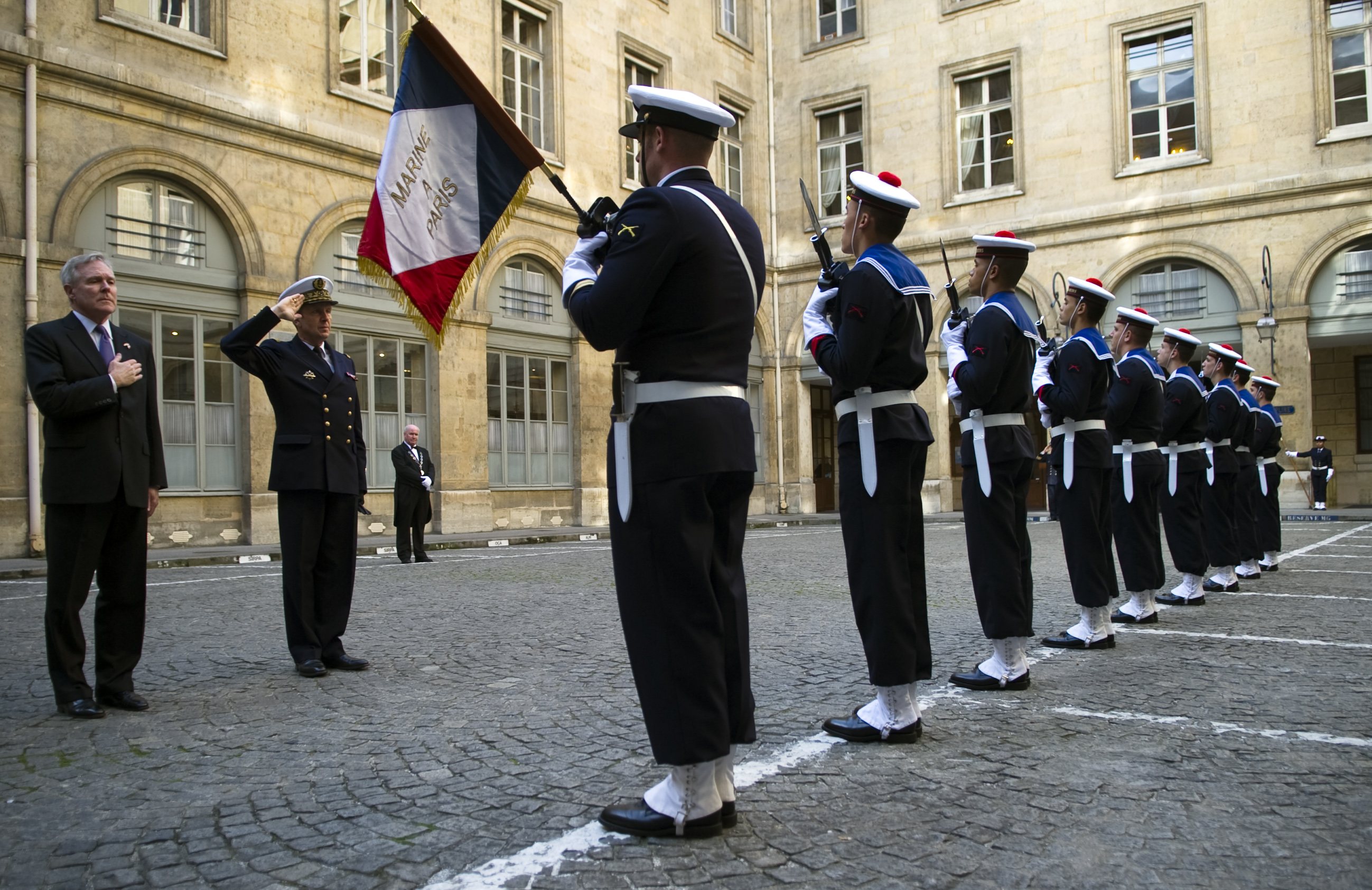
SECNAV, The Honorable Ray Mabus (left) and Amiral Pierre-Francois Forissier.

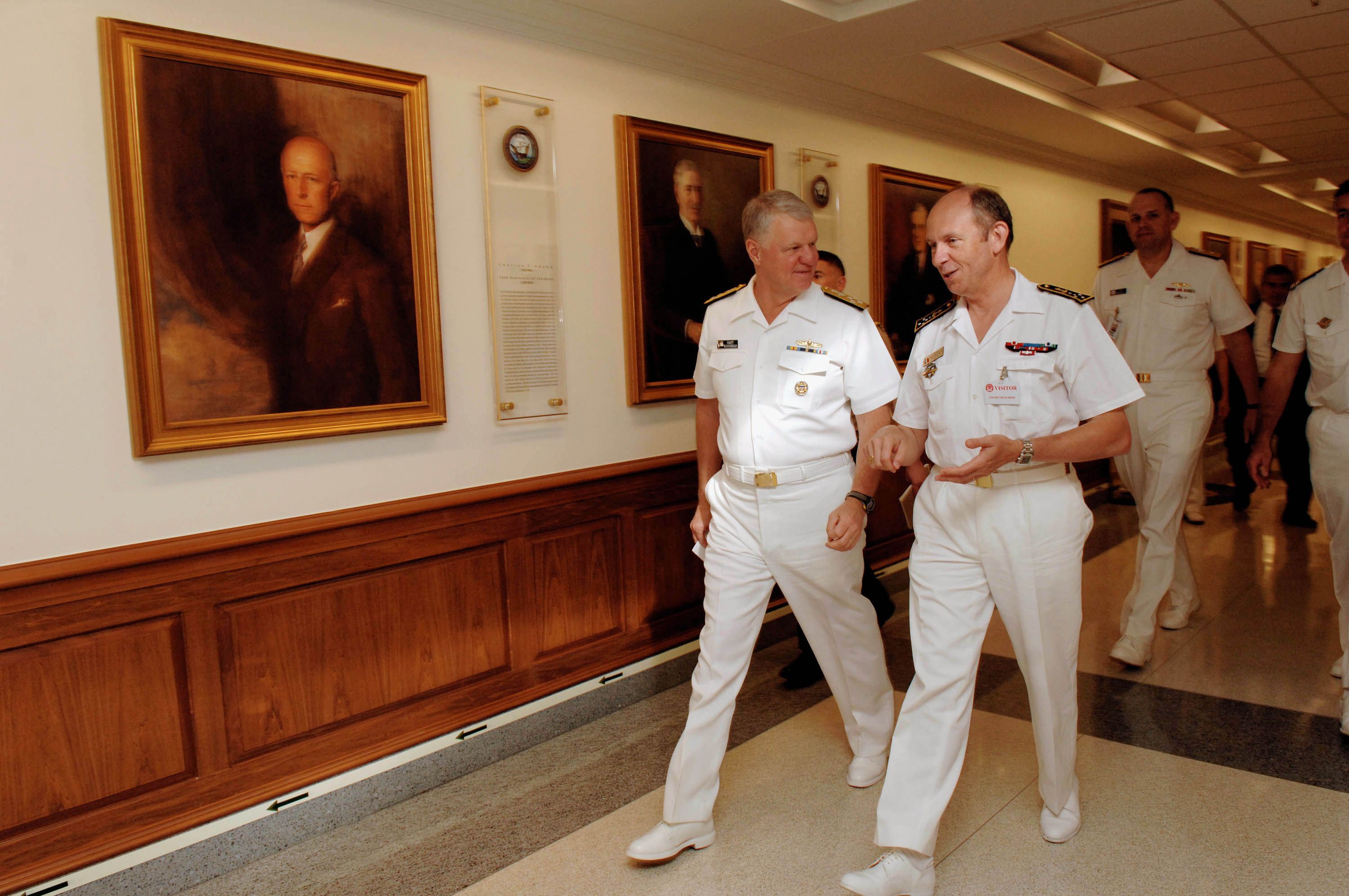
CNO Admiral Gary Roughead (left) with CEMM Admiral Pierre-Francois Forissier.

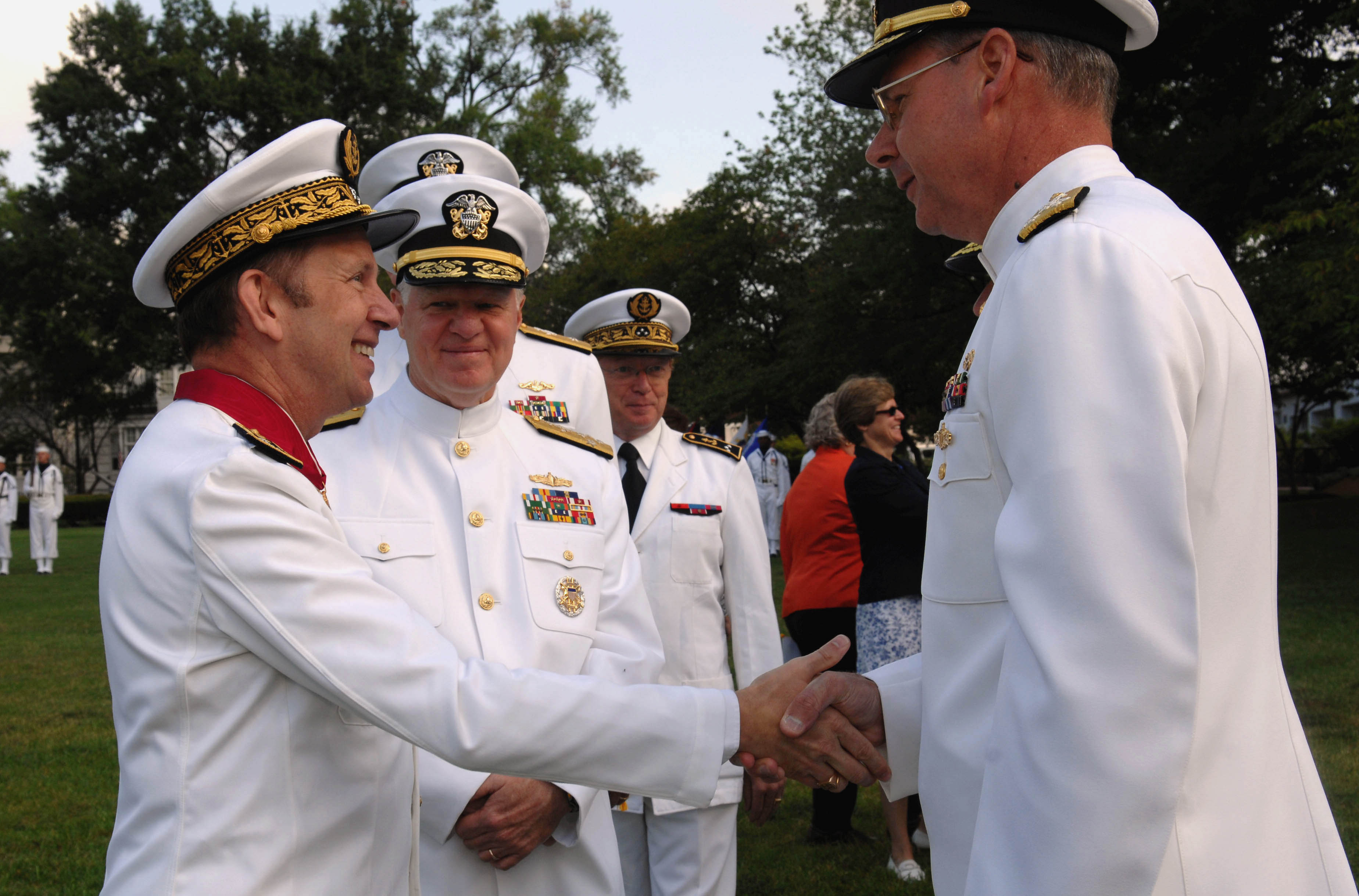
CEMM Admiral Pierre-Francois Forissier (left) greeting Vice-Admiral Kevin M. McCoy.

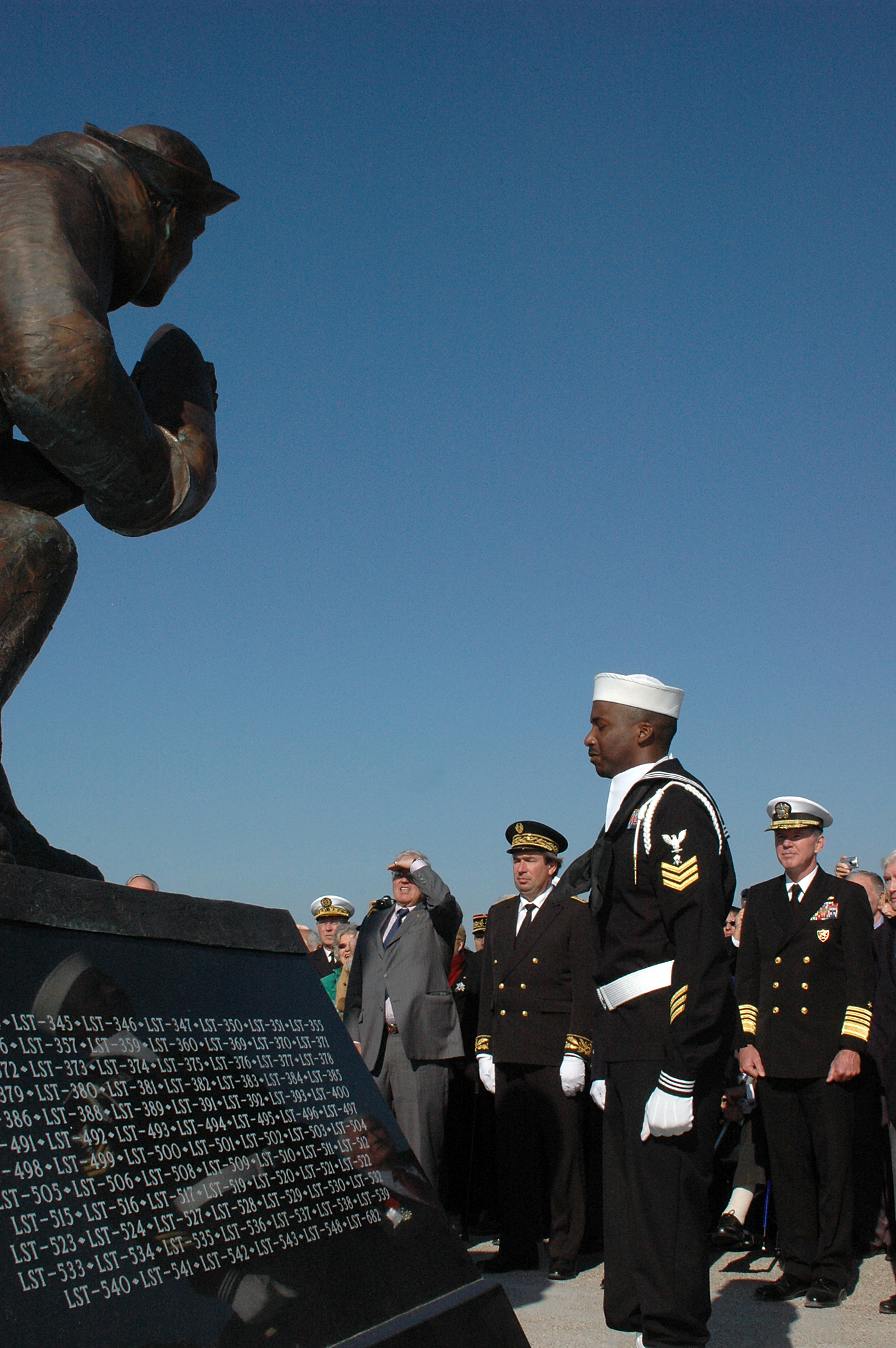
CEMM Admiral Pierre-Francois Forissier (center left) & Admiral Mark P. Fitzgerald in a U.S. Navy unveiling.

== See also ==
- Édouard Guillaud
- Christophe Prazuck
- List of submarines of France

== Notes and references ==
Military offices
Preceded by Alain Oudot de Dainville	Chief of Staff of the French Navy; 2008–2011	Succeeded by Bernard Rogel
