= Rubis-class submarine =

French nuclear-powered attack submarine class

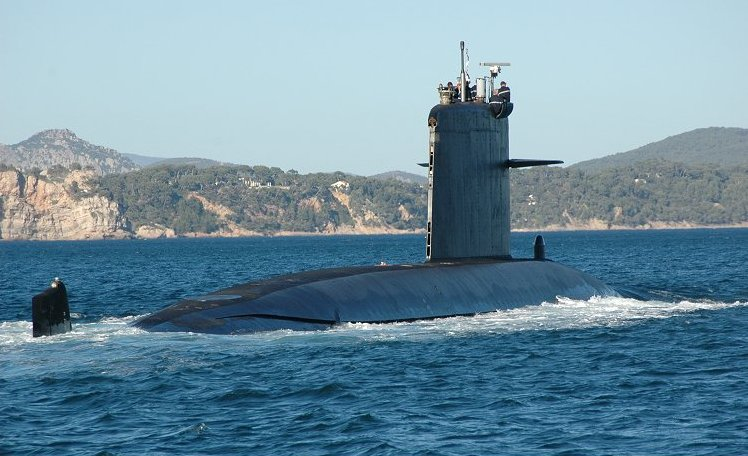
- Saphir in August 2004

Class overview
- Name: Rubis class
- Builders: Arsenal de Cherbourg (DCAN)
- Operators: Marine Nationale
- Preceded by: Daphné class; Agosta class
- Succeeded by: Suffren class
- Built: 1976–1990
- In commission: 1983–present
- Planned: 8
- Completed: 6
- Canceled: 2
- Active: 1
- Retired: 5

General characteristics
- Type: Nuclear-powered attack submarine
- Displacement: 2,400 t (2,400 long tons) (surfaced); 2,600 t (2,600 long tons) (submerged)
- Length: 73.6 m (241 ft 6 in)
- Beam: 7.6 m (24 ft 11 in)
- Draught: 6.4 m (21 ft 0 in)
- Propulsion: Pressurised water CAS-48 nuclear reactor (48 MW), LEU 7%; 2 propulsion turbo generators (2 x 3,150 kW); 1 electric motor (8,448 shp); 1 shaft; 1 auxiliary diesel generator SEMT Pielstick 8PA4V185SM (450 kW)
- Speed: 25 knots (46 km/h; 29 mph)
- Range: Unlimited distance; 20–25 years
- Endurance: 45 days
- Test depth: >300 m (980 ft)
- Complement: 10 officers; 52 officiers mariniers; 8 quartiers-maîtres and mâtelots
- Sensors & processing systems: DMUX 20 active/passive sonar; ETBF DSUV 62C towed array passive sonar; DSUV 22 passive cylindrical array sonar with active transducer; DRUA 33 radar
- Electronic warfare & decoys: ARUR 13
- Armament: 4 × 533 mm (21 in) torpedo tubes; 14 of mixed capacity of the following; F17 mod2 torpedoes; F21 Artemis torpedoes (Perle after rebuild); Exocet SM39 anti-ship missiles; mines

The Rubis class is a class of nuclear-powered attack submarines operated by the French Navy. It originally comprised six boats, the first entering service in 1983 and the last in 1993. Two additional units originally planned were cancelled as a result of post-Cold War budget cuts. All submarines of the Rubis class have been based at Toulon and are part of the Escadrille de sous-marins nucléaires d'attaque. Smaller than contemporary designs of other major world navies, the Rubis class shares many of its system designs with the conventionally-powered Agosta class. In the late 1980s, the Rubis class was proposed to Canada in the context of their plan to acquire nuclear-powered submarines.

The submarines of the class were built in two batches, with the final two built to an improved standard to reduce noise emissions that plagued the original design. Dubbed the AMÉTHYSTE rebuild, the first four hulls were refitted to its standard until they were practically indistinguishable from the final two hulls.

The Rubis class is being phased out and replaced with a new generation of nuclear-powered attack submarines, the Suffren class. The lead boat, Suffren, entered operational service in June 2022. Five of the six Rubis-class submarines, Saphir, Rubis, Casabianca, Émeraude and Perle have been decommissioned in 2019, 2022, 2023, 2024 and 2026 respectively.

== Background and design ==
Silhouette before Améthyste rebuild

Silhouette after Améthyste rebuild

The Rubis class was the second attempt at constructing a nuclear-powered attack submarine. The first, also dubbed Rubis, had been authorised in 1964 but cancelled in 1968, just as the first boat was about to commence construction. However, a new naval plan in 1972, called Plan Bleu, stated a requirement for 20 attack submarines of both nuclear-powered and conventionally-powered types. The new design, designated Type SNA 72 and called a sous-marin nucléaire de chasse (French: hunter nuclear submarine) was smaller than any contemporary nuclear-powered attack submarine design in other major world navies. The small hull design was capable due the development of a compact, integrated nuclear reactor-exchanger with turbo-electric drives. Even then, the project was only considered feasible if equipped with weapons and sensors already in service, with the fire-control, torpedo-launching and submarine-detection systems also found in the Agosta class.

The first four submarines of the class, Rubis, Saphir, Casabianca, and Émeraude were built according to the original specifications. They measured 72.1 metres (236 ft 7 in) long overall with a beam of 7.6 m (24 ft 11 in) and a draught of 6.4 m (21 ft 0 in). The Rubis class had a standard displacement of 2,265 tonnes (2,229 long tons), 2,385 t (2,347 long tons) surfaced and 2,670 t (2,630 long tons) submerged. The boats are of single-hull construction made of 80 HLES high elasticity steel and the forward diving planes are situated high on the conning tower. The Rubis class can dive to depths over 300 m (980 ft).

The submarines are powered by a CAS-48 pressurised water nuclear reactor creating 48 megawatts utilising 7% low-enriched uranium, driving two 3,950-kilowatt turbo-alternator sets. These power a single propeller creating 7,100 kW (9,500 shp). At low speeds, the submarines use natural circulation to reduce noise emissions. In case of a reactor failure, the Rubises have an emergency electric motor powered by batteries or a SEMT-Pielstick 16PA4 diesel generator set with an output of 480 kW (640 hp; 650 PS). On battery power, the vessel has a range of 50 nautical miles (93 km; 58 mi) and endurance for 15 hours. The submarines had a cruising speed of 25 knots (46 km/h; 29 mph) and endurance of 45 days (60 days maximum). Alternating between two different crews, they have an active yearly service of 240 days. The crew initially numbered 66, including 9 officers.

Sharing sensors and weapons with the Agosta class, the Rubises have four 533-millimetre (21 in) torpedo tubes forward. They have stowage for a mix of 14 F17 Mod 2 torpedoes and SM39 Exocet anti-ship missiles. The submarines can fire and guide two torpedoes simultaneously. Instead of torpedoes, the submarine can embark FG 29 mines. The submarines was initially fitted with a DRUA 33 navigation/search radar, ARUR and ARUD electronic warfare systems, DSUV 22 multi-function passive sonar array, DUUA 2B active sonar, and DUUX 2 acoustic intercept sonar.

=== AMÉTHYSTE rebuild ===
The initial design of Rubis proved to be problematic with unexpectedly high noise levels. This led to the Améthyste silencing program (AMÉlioration Tactique HYdrodynamique Silence Transmission Ecoute, literally Silence-Transmission-Listening Hydrodynamic Tactical Improvement) which was applied during construction of the fifth (Améthyste) and sixth (Perle) hulls. The hull form was reshaped and lengthened to 73.6 m (241 ft 6 in) while the superstructure and external bow were made of glass-reinforced plastic. To further reduce noise emissions, the machinery was given flexible mountings. The program included upgrades to the sonar and additional upgrades of the electronics. The Rubis class had a DSUB 62C towed passive sonar array, DUUG 2 sonar intercept, DMUX 20 sonar suite installed and had their acoustic intercept upgraded to DUUX 5. With the upgrades tested and proven, the original four boats were rebuilt to the same standards between 1989 and 1995 and were nearly identical to the final two ships of the class.

== Boats ==
Rubis class construction data
Pennant	Name	Builder	Laid down	Launched	Commissioned	Status
S601	Rubis (ex-Provence)	DCNS, Cherbourg, France	11 December 1976	7 July 1979	23 February 1983	Decommissioned November 2022
S602	Saphir (ex-Bretagne)	DCNS, Cherbourg, France	1 September 1979	1 September 1981	6 July 1984	Decommissioned July 2019
S603	Casabianca (ex-Bourgogne)	DCNS, Cherbourg, France	19 September 1981	22 December 1984	21 April 1987	Decommissioned 27 September 2023
S604	Émeraude	DCNS, Cherbourg, France	4 March 1983 (Note: Jordan has the date as 1 March 1983)	12 April 1986	15 September 1988	Decommissioned 12 December 2024
S605	Améthyste	DCNS, Cherbourg, France	31 October 1984	14 May 1988	3 March 1992	In service
S606	Perle	DCNS, Cherbourg, France	22 March 1987	22 September 1990	7 July 1993	Decommissioned 23 June 2026
S607	Turquoise	DCNS, Cherbourg, France	Cancelled 1991			
S608	Diamant	DCNS, Cherbourg, France	Cancelled 1992			

== Construction and career ==
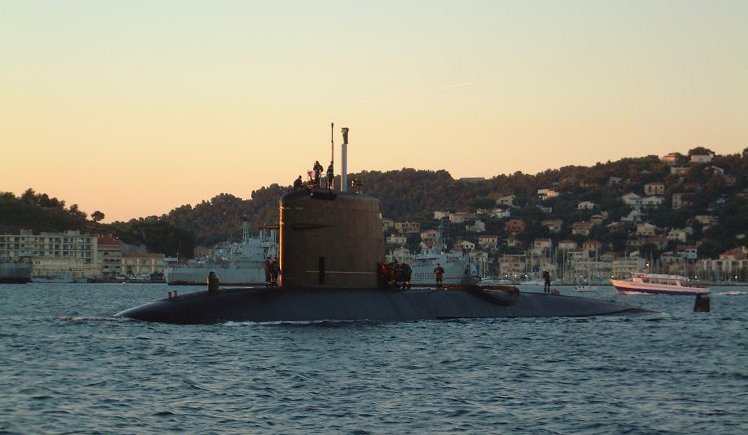
Rubis

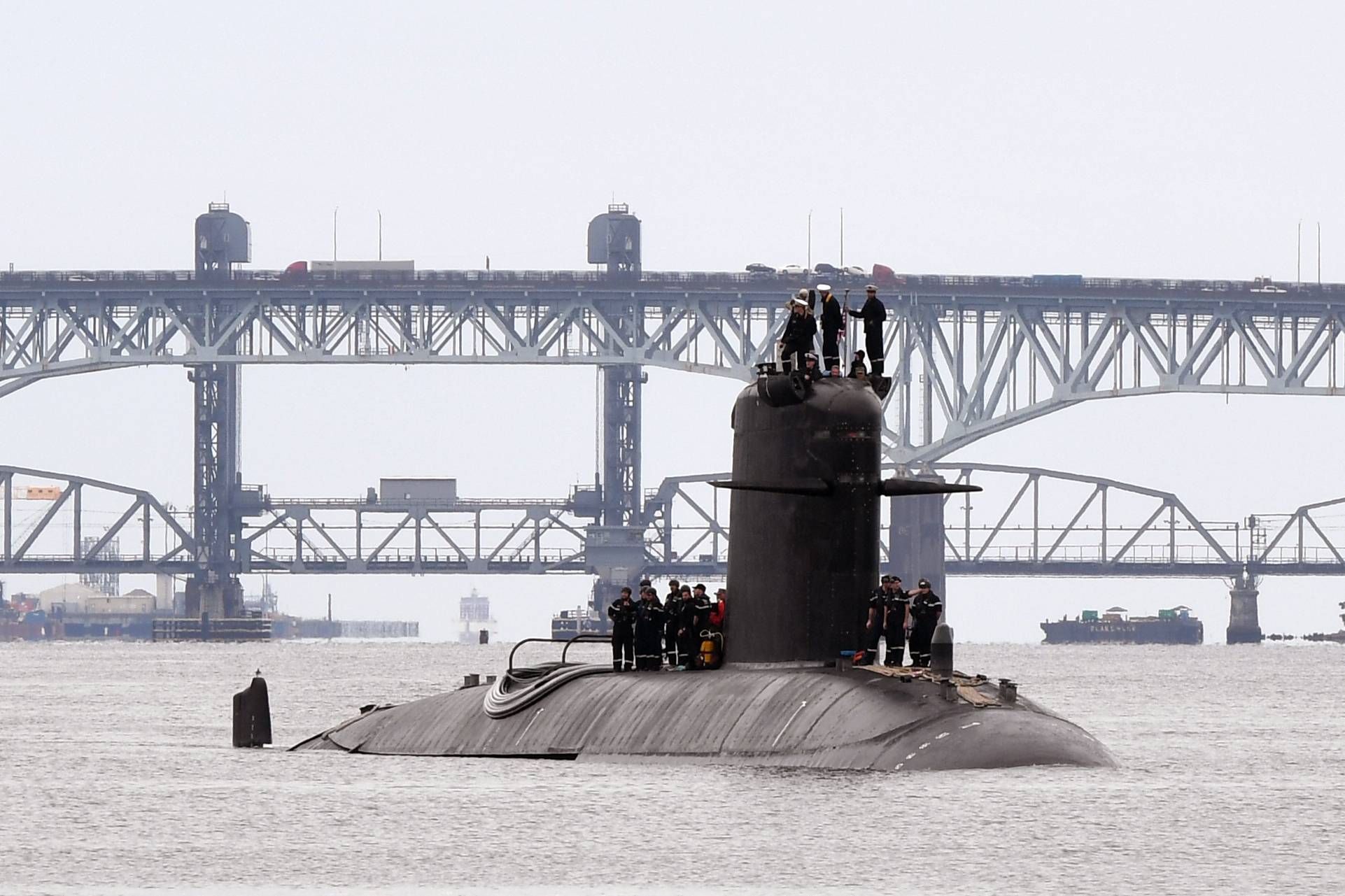
Amethyste

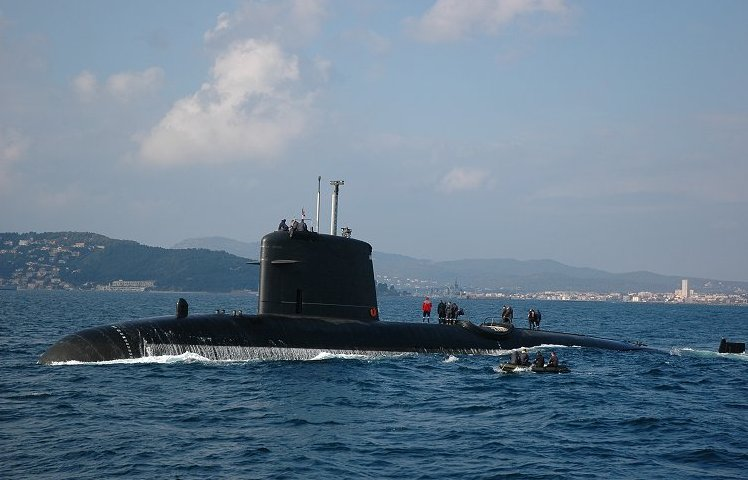
Casabianca

The first hull was laid down in December 1976 and launched in 1979. The first ship cost 850 million French francs to build. The first three vessels originally sported the names Provence, Bretagne and Bourgogne respectively, but their names were changed to their current monikers in November 1980. Rubis was financed via the Third Military Equipment Plan, and the following three hulls were part of the Fourth Military Equipment Plan. Rubis' reactor went critical in February 1981 and trials began in June. Hulls five and six were ordered on 17 October 1984 and the seventh on 24 April 1990. However, plans for the eighth submarine of the class were cancelled in September 1991 and construction for the seventh was delayed. Eventually construction of the seventh hull was cancelled in June 1992, but not before the French Navy attempted to sell the vessel as a conventionally-powered submarine, but found no buyers. All six submarines are based at Toulon as part of the Escadrille de sous-marins nucléaires d'attaque.

Saphir was the first to undergo the AMÉTHYSTE rebuild, being out of service from November 1989 to May 1991. Rubis followed from September 1992 to July 1993. On 20 August 1993, Rubis collided with the oil tanker Lyria. From 1993 to 1994, Casabianca underwent the AMÉTHYSTE rebuild. On 30 March 1994, Émeraude had a steam leakage in the secondary steam loop, suffering ten casualties including the vessel's commanding officer. Émeraude would undergo the AMÉTHYSTE rebuild from May 1994 to December 1995.

During the Péan inter-allied manoeuvres of 1998, Casabianca managed to "sink" the United States Navy aircraft carrier USS Dwight D. Eisenhower and the Ticonderoga-class cruiser that was escorting her. In September 2000 Saphir experienced excessive radioactivity in the primary reactor loop forcing the submarine to be withdrawn from service for six months to undergo recoring.

During COMPTUEX 2015, an exercise led by the United States Navy, Saphir successfully defeated the aircraft carrier USS Theodore Roosevelt and her escort, managing to "sink" the US carrier. This was widely advertised by the French Navy but unmentioned by the US Navy.

On 12 June 2020, Perle caught fire in dry dock while undergoing major renovations. The fire broke out around 10:35 local time in the forward section of the submarine and was described as being "unbelievably fierce". According to French naval sources, there were no weapons or nuclear fuel aboard at the time. In October 2020 it was announced that Perle would be repaired using the forward section of the decommissioned boat, Saphir. The repairs were projected to be completed in 2022 and her return to service was anticipated in 2023. Perle returned to sea in May 2023 to begin post-refit sea trials. However, she was retired in 2026 leaving just one submarine of the class, Amethyste, in service.

The French Navy started replacing the Rubis class with the Suffren-class submarines in 2020.

== Proposed Canada class ==
In 1987, the Canadian White Paper on Defence recommended the purchase of 10 to 12 Rubis or Trafalgar-class submarines under technology transfer, which would be known as the Canada class. with the choice of the type of submarine due to be confirmed before Summer 1988. The goal was to build up a three-ocean navy and to assert Canadian sovereignty over Arctic waters.

Neither design met the Canadian Statement of Requirement (SOR), the initial Rubis design being deemed noisy underwater and slow. It also came with the caveat that the first 4–5 submarines would have to be built in France. However, unlike the British Trafalgar class, the Rubis design did not require United States permission to transfer the nuclear propulsion technology, as the Americans were certain to invoke their veto of the sale to Canada. The French brought back a revision to their design baptized Canadian AMETHYSTE, underlining the fact that the proposal was for the new standard carried by the fifth French submarine of the series, Améthyste, a standard the previous four boats would also soon be upgraded to in order to solve the issues plaguing the original design, notably the noisiness. The French also added an "ice pick" so the submarine could operate under ice and were developing a modification for their torpedo tubes which were too short to use the Mark 48 torpedoes. The purchase was finally abandoned in April 1989 due to internal political opposition to nuclear submarines, American opposition to the program and high costs. The end of the Cold War, sometimes cited as a reason for the cancellation, only started to become fully apparent several months later with the fall of the Berlin Wall.

== See also ==
- List of submarines of France
- List of submarine classes in service
- Submarine forces (France)
- Future of the French Navy
- Cruise missile submarine
