= ECAN =

ECAN may refer to:

- Établissement des Constructions et Armes Navales, a French institution for the procurement of equipment of the French Navy
  - ECAN F17 – a type of French torpedo
- Echo cancellation – technology and processes for removing echo in voice telephony
- ECan, the promotional name for Environment Canterbury, the Canterbury Regional Council in New Zealand
