= French submarine Émeraude (S604) =

Nuclear attack submarine

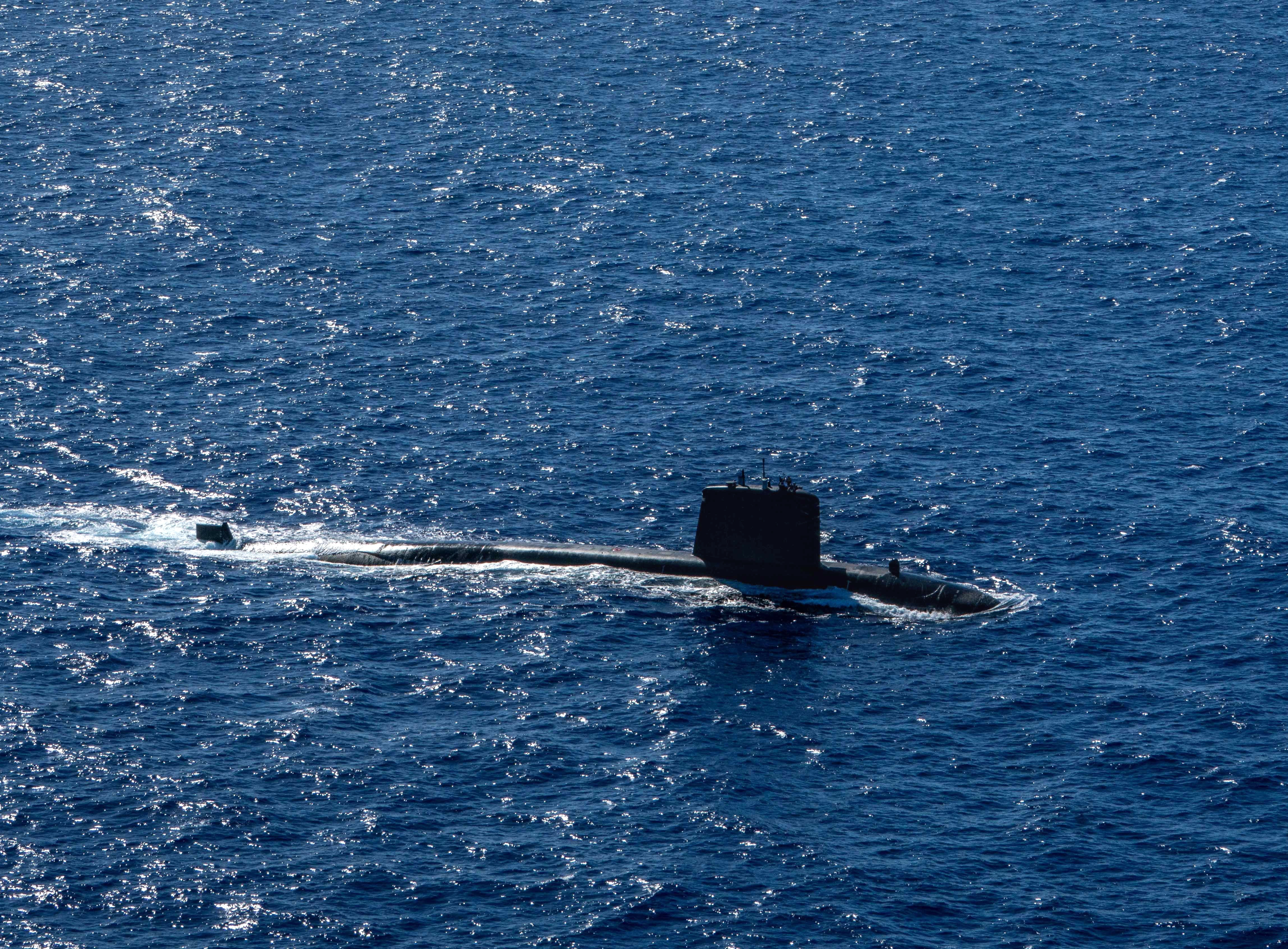
- Émeraude near Saint-Mandrier-sur-Mer in early morning

History

France
- Name: Émeraude
- Namesake: Emerald
- Laid down: October 1982
- Launched: 12 April 1986
- Commissioned: 15 September 1988
- Decommissioned: 12 December 2024
- Home port: Toulon
- Status: Decommissioned

General characteristics
- Class & type: Rubis-class submarine
- Displacement: 2600 t (2400 t surfaced)
- Length: 73.6 m (241 ft)
- Beam: 7.6 m (25 ft)
- Draught: 6.4 m (21 ft)
- Propulsion: Pressurised water K48 nuclear reactor (48 MW), LEU 7%; 2 turbo-alternators; 1 electric engine (7 MW); one propeller; 1 diesel-alternators SEMT Pielstick 8 PA 4V 185 SM; one auxiliary engine, 5 MW.
- Speed: over 25 knots (46 km/h; 29 mph)
- Range: 8,500 nautical miles (15,700 km; 9,800 mi)
- Test depth: over 300 m
- Complement: 10 officers; 52 warrant officers; 8 petty officers
- Sensors & processing systems: DMUX 20 multifonction; ETBF DSUV 62C tugged antenna; DSUV 22 microphone system; DRUA 33 radar
- Electronic warfare & decoys: ARUR 13
- Armament: 4 × 533mm tubes.; total mixed load of 14; F17 mod2 torpedoes; 14 Exocet SM39; mines

Émeraude was a nuclear attack submarine from the first generation of attack submarines of the French Navy. Having been in service since 1988, she was retired in 2024.

The boat was the fourth of the Rubis series. Between May 1994 and December 1995, the boat undertook a major refitting, which upgraded capabilities to the level of Améthyste.

== Background and design ==
Silhouette before Améthyste rebuild

Silhouette after Améthyste rebuild

The Rubis class was the second attempt at constructing a nuclear-powered attack submarine. The first, also dubbed Rubis, had been authorised in 1964 but cancelled in 1968, just as the first boat was about to commence construction. However, a new naval plan in 1972, called Plan Bleu, stated a requirement for 20 attack submarines of both nuclear-powered and conventionally-powered types. The new design, designated Type SNA 72 and called a sous-marin nucléaire de chasse (French: hunter nuclear submarine) was smaller than any contemporary nuclear-powered attack submarine design in other major world navies. The small hull design was capable due the development of a compact, integrated nuclear reactor-exchanger with turbo-electric drives. Even then, the project was only considered feasible if equipped with weapons and sensors already in service, with the fire-control, torpedo-launching and submarine-detection systems also found in the Agosta class.

The first four submarines of the class, Rubis, Saphir, Casabianca, and Émeraude were built according to the original specifications. They measured 72.1 metres (236 ft 7 in) long overall with a beam of 7.6 m (24 ft 11 in) and a draught of 6.4 m (21 ft 0 in). The Rubis class had a standard displacement of 2,265 tonnes (2,229 long tons), 2,385 t (2,347 long tons) surfaced and 2,670 t (2,630 long tons) submerged. The boats are of single-hull construction made of 80 HLES high elasticity steel and the forward diving planes are situated high on the conning tower. The Rubis class can dive to depths over 300 m (980 ft).

The submarines are powered by a CAS-48 pressurised water nuclear reactor creating 48 megawatts utilising 7% low-enriched uranium, driving two 3,950-kilowatt turbo-alternator sets. These power a single propeller creating 7,100 kW (9,500 shp). At low speeds, the submarines use natural circulation to reduce noise emissions. In case of a reactor failure, the Rubises have an emergency electric motor powered by batteries or a SEMT-Pielstick 16PA4 diesel generator set with an output of 480 kW (640 hp; 650 PS). On battery power, the vessel has a range of 50 nautical miles (93 km; 58 mi) and endurance for 15 hours. The submarines had a cruising speed of 25 knots (46 km/h; 29 mph) and endurance of 45 days (60 days maximum). Alternating between two different crews, they have an active yearly service of 240 days. The crew initially numbered 66, including 9 officers.

Sharing sensors and weapons with the Agosta class, the Rubises have four 533-millimetre (21 in) torpedo tubes forward. They have stowage for a mix of 14 F17 Mod 2 torpedoes and SM39 Exocet anti-ship missiles. The submarines can fire and guide two torpedoes simultaneously. Instead of torpedoes, the submarine can embark FG 29 mines. The submarines was initially fitted with a DRUA 33 navigation/search radar, ARUR and ARUD electronic warfare systems, DSUV 22 multi-function passive sonar array, DUUA 2B active sonar, and DUUX 2 acoustic intercept sonar.

=== AMÉTHYSTE rebuild ===
The initial design of Rubis proved to be problematic with unexpectedly high noise levels. This led to the Améthyste silencing program (AMÉlioration Tactique HYdrodynamique Silence Transmission Ecoute, literally Silence-Transmission-Listening Hydrodynamic Tactical Improvement) which was applied during construction of the fifth (Améthyste) and sixth (Perle) hulls. The hull form was reshaped and lengthened to 73.6 m (241 ft 6 in) while the superstructure and external bow were made of glass-reinforced plastic. To further reduce noise emissions, the machinery was given flexible mountings. The program included upgrades to the sonar and additional upgrades of the electronics. The Rubis class had a DSUB 62C towed passive sonar array, DUUG 2 sonar intercept, DMUX 20 sonar suite installed and had their acoustic intercept upgraded to DUUX 5. With the upgrades tested and proven, the original four boats were rebuilt to the same standards between 1989 and 1995 and were nearly identical to the final two ships of the class.

== Service history ==
On 30 March 1994, an accidental explosion occurred in the engine compartment while the boat was engaged in a naval exercise off Toulon. The explosion killed ten men, including the commander, who were examining the turbo-alternator room. The boat returned to base under diesel and battery power.

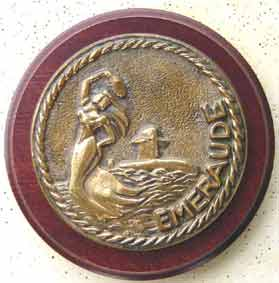
Tampion of Émeraude

In June 2009, Émeraude was sent to the mid Atlantic to aid in the search for the flight data recorder and cockpit voice recorder from the ill-fated Air France Flight 447.

In February 2021, the submarine successfully concluded a passage of the South China Sea.

In October 2024, Émeraude departed Toulon for the final time, transitting to Cherbourg for her decommissioning but taking part in exercises with the Moroccan Navy en route. On 15 November 2024, the submarine arrived in Cherbourg to be decommissioned.

== See also ==
- List of submarines of France

== Notes and references ==
=== Sources ===
- Sous-marin nucléaire d'attaque Émeraude netmarine.net
- Couhat, Jean Labayle, ed. (1986). Combat Fleets of the World 1986/87. Annapolis, Maryland: Naval Institute Press. ISBN 0-85368-860-5.
- Jordan, John (1995). "France". In Chumbley, Stephen (ed.). Conway's All The World's Fighting Ships 1947–1995. Annapolis, Maryland: Naval Institute Press. pp. 95–131. ISBN 1-55750-132-7.
- Saunders, Stephen, ed. (2009). Jane's Fighting Ships 2009–2010 (112 ed.). Alexandria, Virginia: Jane's Information Group Inc. ISBN 978-0-7106-2888-6.
- Wertheim, Eric, ed. (2013). The Naval Institute Guide to Combat Fleets of the World (16th ed.). Annapolis, Maryland: Naval Institute Press. ISBN 9-7-815911-4954-5.
