= Strategic Oceanic Force =

French nuclear ballistic missile submarine force

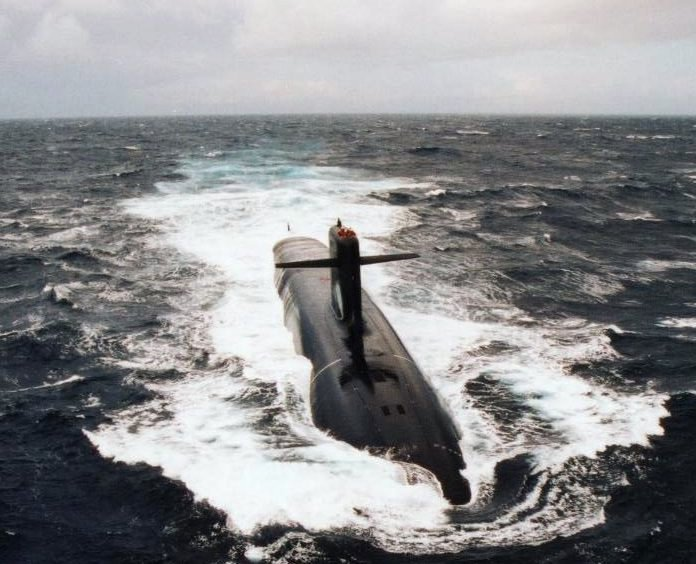
Le Téméraire

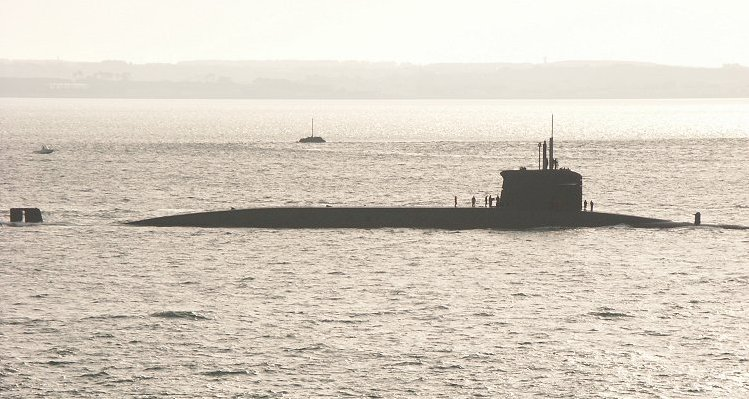
L'Inflexible

The Strategic Ocean Force (French: Force océanique stratégique, FOST) is one of two terms that describe the submarine component of the French Navy. Prior to 1999, FOST grouped ballistic missile submarines with a role in France's nuclear deterrent. Since 1999, they have been integrated with the Submarine Forces, which prior to that date was responsible solely for France's attack submarines. The two terms are now used separately, or in combination, for the combined force, which includes both ballistic missile and attack submarines, all of which are nuclear-powered.

The French Strategic Ocean Force Command ALFOST was set up in 1972 under a Squadron Vice-Admiral.

== Generality ==
The Strategic Ocean Force (French: Force océanique stratégique, FOST), created on March 1, 1972, constitutes the principal composite of the Strategic French Nuclear Forces (French: Force de dissuasion Nucléaire Française, FNS).

FOST was placed under the command of a Squadron Vice-Admiral (Officers of Admiral rank) (French: L'Officier général de marine), hence the acronym ALFOST. With the dissolution of the Atlantic Attack Submarine Group, the submarines with conventional propulsion were grouped with the nuclear submarines from July 1, 1999.

== Force de dissuasion ==
The Strategic Force was born after World War II from the will of general de Gaulle to possess a nuclear arm. The French nuclear ballistic missile submarines armed with submarine-launched ballistic missiles, in relation to their discretion in the various oceanic patrol zones, ensure a guaranteed retaliatory nuclear strike (second strike capability).

Since 1985, the strategy of nuclear deterrence in France armed six French nuclear ballistic missile submarines in service, five in service since 1991, and four since 1997; maintaining a permanent presence around the oceans and seas.

Deterrence is ensured in 2014 by the permanent deployment of the French nuclear ballistic missile submarines of the Triomphant-class.

Between 1972 and April 2014, hundreds of patrols were realized.

The first submarine class of French nuclear ballistic missile submarines in service was the Redoutable class, the head of the series, which was put in dry-docks under authorization in March 1963, with construction commencing in 1964 and was launched on March 29, 1967, in presence of President of France Charles de Gaulle. Trials of theclass commenced in 1969 and the boat entered into service on December 1, 1971.

Six French nuclear ballistic missile submarines of the Redoutable class capable of carrying sixteen ballistic missiles were built:

- Le Redoutable (in service 1971–1991)
- Le Terrible (1973–1996)
- Le Foudroyant (1974–1998)
- L'Indomptable (1976–2003)
- Le Tonnant (1980–1999)
- L'Inflexible (1985–2008)

Four French nuclear ballistic missile submarines of a newer generation, the Triomphant class, are in service in 2013 in the force océanique stratégique of the French Navy:

- Le Triomphant (S616) (entered into service in 1997)
- Le Téméraire (S617) (entered into service in 1999)
- Le Vigilant (S618) (entered into service in 2004)
- Le Terrible (S619) (entered into service in 2010). Le Terrible was presented on March 21, 2008, and entered service at the end of September 2010 to replace the L'Inflexible, last of the retired Redoutable-class ballistic missile submarine in 2008.

The armament systems of the ballistic missile submarines include in general:

- 16 M45 missiles with TN 75 warheads (nuclear deterrence). French nuclear deterrence also includes M51 missiles.
- Four 533 mm tubes for F17 torpedoes and Exocet SM39 anti-ship missiles.

The mission of a French nuclear ballistic missile submarine is simple: leave the designated port of attachment, in the most discreet possible way, remain undetectable all along the mission to be able at any moment launch a nuclear strike, under orders of the President of France.

== See also ==
- History of France's military nuclear program
- Chief of Staff of the French Navy
- French Navy
  - French Naval Aviation
  - List of Escorteurs of the French Navy
  - List of submarines of France
- French Air Force
  - Strategic Air Forces Command

== Bibliographies ==
Y.Cariou, FOST Force Océanique Stratégique, Marines Editions, 2007
