= French submarine Améthyste =

French nuclear-powered attack submarine

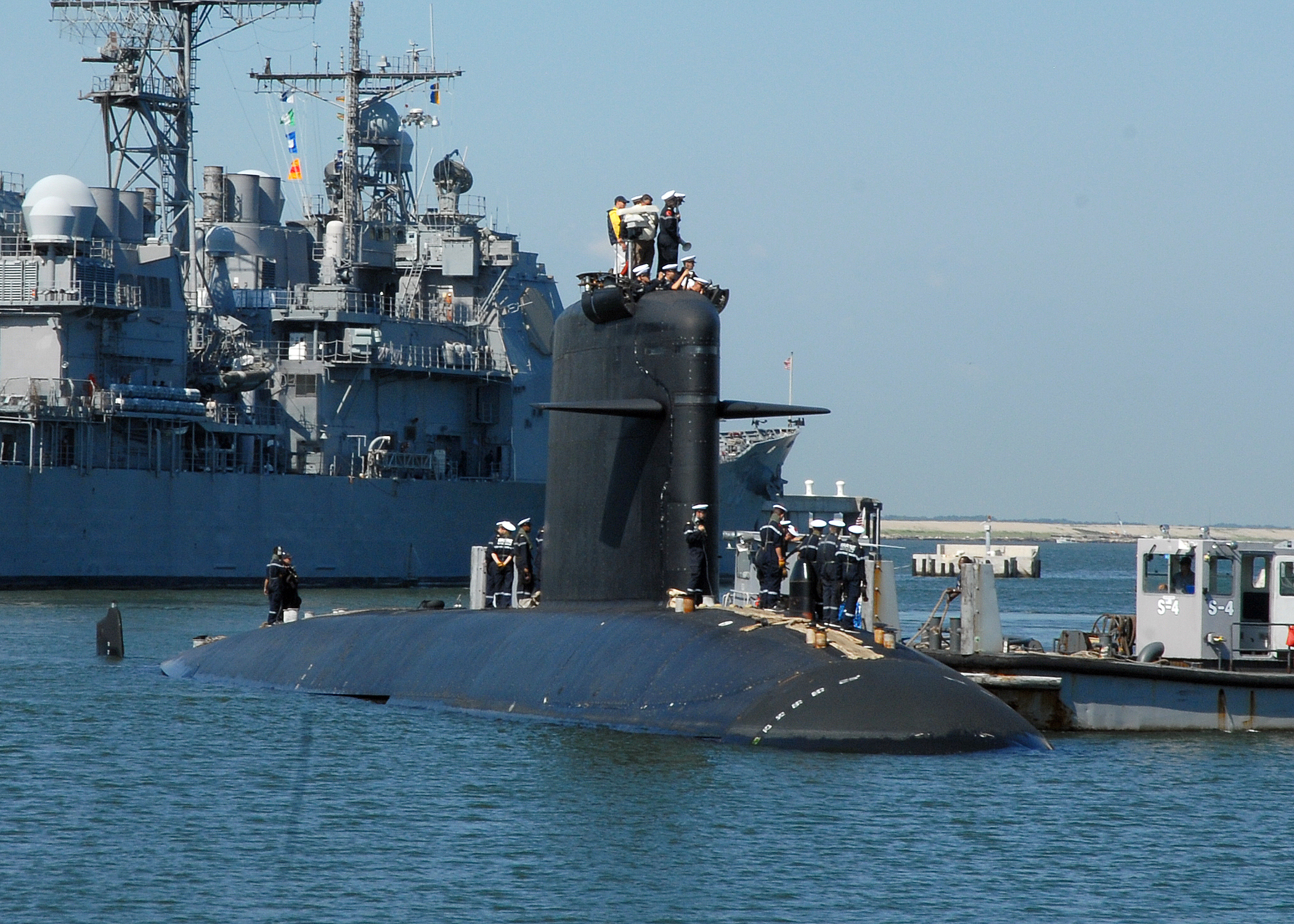
- Améthyste arriving in Norfolk, Virginia

History

France
- Name: Améthyste
- Namesake: Amethyst
- Laid down: 31 October 1983
- Launched: 14 May 1988
- Commissioned: 3 March 1992
- Decommissioned: Projected 2027
- In service: 20 March 1992
- Home port: Toulon
- Status: In active service

General characteristics
- Class & type: Rubis-class submarine
- Displacement: 2,600 t (2,559 long tons); 2,400 t (2,362 long tons) surfaced
- Length: 73.6 m (241 ft 6 in)
- Beam: 7.6 m (24 ft 11 in)
- Draught: 6.4 m (21 ft 0 in)
- Propulsion: Pressurised water K48 nuclear reactor (48 MW), LEU 7%; 2 turbo-alternators; 1 electric engine (7 MW); one propeller; 1 diesel-alternators SEMT Pielstick 8 PA 4V 185 SM; one auxiliary engine, 5 MW.
- Speed: over 25 knots (46 km/h; 29 mph)
- Range: 8,500 nmi (15,700 km; 9,800 mi)
- Endurance: 60 days
- Test depth: over 300 m (980 ft)
- Complement: 8 officers; 52 warrant officers; 8 petty officers
- Sensors & processing systems: DMUX 20 multifunction; ETBF DSUV 62C tugged antenna; DSUV 22 microphone system; DRUA 33 radar
- Electronic warfare & decoys: ARUR 13
- Armament: 4 × 533 mm (21 in) tubes; total mixed load of 14; F17 mod2 torpedoes; Exocet SM39; Mines

Améthyste (French: [ametist]; "Amethyst") is a nuclear-powered attack submarine of the French Navy, the fifth of the Rubis type. The boat is a major upgrade upon the initial design of the Rubis type, and earlier units have since been refitted to meet her standards. With the decommissioning of her sister boat Perle in 2026, she is the last vessel of her class in active service.

== Background and design ==
Silhouette before Améthyste rebuild

Silhouette after Améthyste rebuild

The Rubis class was the second attempt at constructing a nuclear-powered attack submarine. The first, also dubbed Rubis, had been authorised in 1964 but cancelled in 1968, just as the first boat was about to commence construction. However, a new naval plan in 1972, called Plan Bleu, stated a requirement for 20 attack submarines of both nuclear-powered and conventionally-powered types. The new design, designated Type SNA 72 and called a sous-marin nucléaire de chasse (French: hunter nuclear submarine) was smaller than any contemporary nuclear-powered attack submarine design in other major world navies. The small hull design was capable due the development of a compact, integrated nuclear reactor-exchanger with turbo-electric drives. Even then, the project was only considered feasible if equipped with weapons and sensors already in service, with the fire-control, torpedo-launching and submarine-detection systems also found in the Agosta class.

The first four submarines of the class, Rubis, Saphir, Casabianca, and Émeraude were built according to the original specifications. They measured 72.1 metres (236 ft 7 in) long overall with a beam of 7.6 m (24 ft 11 in) and a draught of 6.4 m (21 ft 0 in). The Rubis class had a standard displacement of 2,265 tonnes (2,229 long tons), 2,385 t (2,347 long tons) surfaced and 2,670 t (2,630 long tons) submerged. The boats are of single-hull construction made of 80 HLES high elasticity steel and the forward diving planes are situated high on the conning tower. The Rubis class can dive to depths over 300 m (980 ft).

The submarines are powered by a CAS-48 pressurised water nuclear reactor creating 48 megawatts utilising 7% low-enriched uranium, driving two 3,950-kilowatt turbo-alternator sets. These power a single propeller creating 7,100 kW (9,500 shp). At low speeds, the submarines use natural circulation to reduce noise emissions. In case of a reactor failure, the Rubises have an emergency electric motor powered by batteries or a SEMT-Pielstick 16PA4 diesel generator set with an output of 480 kW (640 hp; 650 PS). On battery power, the vessel has a range of 50 nautical miles (93 km; 58 mi) and endurance for 15 hours. The submarines had a cruising speed of 25 knots (46 km/h; 29 mph) and endurance of 45 days (60 days maximum). Alternating between two different crews, they have an active yearly service of 240 days. The crew initially numbered 66, including 9 officers.

Sharing sensors and weapons with the Agosta class, the Rubises have four 533-millimetre (21 in) torpedo tubes forward. They have stowage for a mix of 14 F17 Mod 2 torpedoes and SM39 Exocet anti-ship missiles. The submarines can fire and guide two torpedoes simultaneously. Instead of torpedoes, the submarine can embark FG 29 mines. The submarines was initially fitted with a DRUA 33 navigation/search radar, ARUR and ARUD electronic warfare systems, DSUV 22 multi-function passive sonar array, DUUA 2B active sonar, and DUUX 2 acoustic intercept sonar.

=== AMÉTHYSTE rebuild ===
The initial design of Rubis proved to be problematic with unexpectedly high noise levels. This led to the Améthyste silencing program (AMÉlioration Tactique HYdrodynamique Silence Transmission Ecoute, literally Silence-Transmission-Listening Hydrodynamic Tactical Improvement) which was applied during construction of the fifth (Améthyste) and sixth (Perle) hulls. The hull form was reshaped and lengthened to 73.6 m (241 ft 6 in) while the superstructure and external bow were made of glass-reinforced plastic. To further reduce noise emissions, the machinery was given flexible mountings. The program included upgrades to the sonar and additional upgrades of the electronics. The Rubis class had a DSUB 62C towed passive sonar array, DUUG 2 sonar intercept, DMUX 20 sonar suite installed and had their acoustic intercept upgraded to DUUX 5. With the upgrades tested and proven, the original four boats were rebuilt to the same standards between 1989 and 1995 and were nearly identical to the final two ships of the class.

== Service history ==
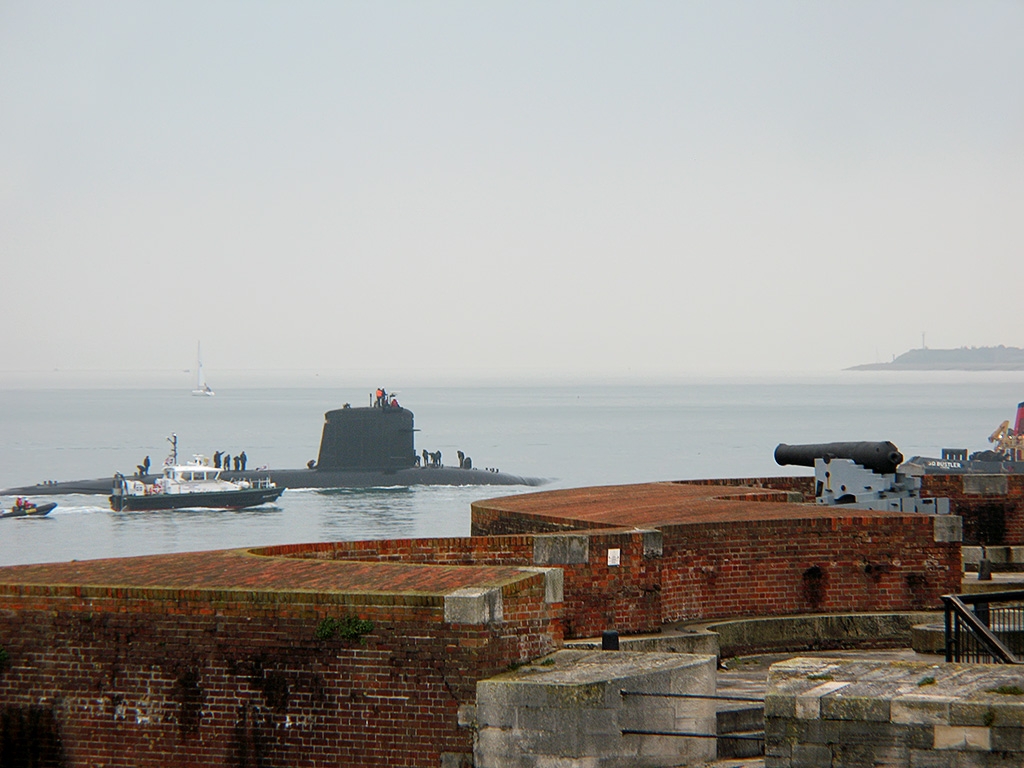
Améthyste entering Portsmouth Naval Base, UK

Améthyste took part in Operation Allied Force, the 1999 bombing campaign over Yugoslavia, by protecting the NATO aeronaval group. Along with Rubis, the boat was one of the two submarines that interdicted the Kotor straits to the Serbian Navy, thus effectively forbidding their use. The boat also gathered information for the coalition.

The submarine Améthyste was part of the French naval task group led by the aircraft carrier Charles de Gaulle that departed Toulon on 30 October 2010 for a four-month deployment to the Mediterranean Sea, Red Sea, Indian Ocean and Persian Gulf. The task group commander, Rear Admiral Jean-Louis Kerignard, defined force's mission as follows:

"The force would help allied navies fight piracy off the coast of Somalia and send jets to support NATO in the skies above Afghanistan."

Once on station, the Charles de Gaulle carrier task group joined two U.S. Navy carrier strike groups led by the Nimitz-class aircraft carriers USS Abraham Lincoln and USS Harry S. Truman operating in the Persian Gulf. Subsequently, between 7–14 January 2011, the French carrier task group led by Charles de Gaulle participated with bilateral naval exercise, code named Varuna 10, with the Indian Navy. Indian naval units participating in Varuna 10 included the aircraft carrier Viraat, the frigates Godavari and Ganga; and the diesel-electric submarine Shalki. Varuna 10 was a two-phase naval exercise, with the harbor phase taking place between 7–11 January and the sea phase between 11 and 14 January in the Arabian Sea.

It is anticipated that Améthyste will be withdrawn from service in 2027.

== Decorations ==
The fanion of Améthyste is decorated:

- Croix de guerre des théâtres d'opérations extérieures with 1 bronze star;
- Cross for Military Valour with 1 palm.

== In fiction ==
Améthyste is featured along with the French SSBN Le Téméraire in the 2019 The Wolf's Call film.

== Notes and references ==
=== Sources ===
- Couhat, Jean Labayle, ed. (1986). Combat Fleets of the World 1986/87. Annapolis, Maryland: Naval Institute Press. ISBN 0-85368-860-5.
- Jordan, John (1995). "France". In Chumbley, Stephen (ed.). Conway's All The World's Fighting Ships 1947–1995. Annapolis, Maryland: Naval Institute Press. pp. 95–131. ISBN 1-55750-132-7.
- Saunders, Stephen, ed. (2009). Jane's Fighting Ships 2009–2010 (112 ed.). Alexandria, Virginia: Jane's Information Group Inc. ISBN 978-0-7106-2888-6.
- Wertheim, Eric, ed. (2013). The Naval Institute Guide to Combat Fleets of the World (16th ed.). Annapolis, Maryland: Naval Institute Press. ISBN 9-7-815911-4954-5.
