= French submarine Saphir (S602) =

French nuclear-powered attack submarine

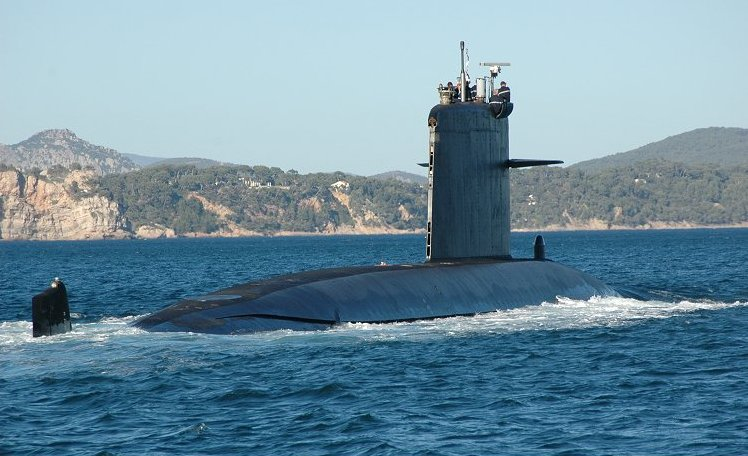

History

France
- Name: Le Saphir
- Namesake: Sapphire
- Laid down: 1 September 1979
- Launched: 1 September 1981
- Commissioned: 6 July 1984
- Decommissioned: July 2019
- Home port: Toulon
- Fate: Decommissioned July 2019

General characteristics
- Class & type: Rubis-class submarine
- Displacement: 2600 t (2400 t surfaced)
- Length: 73.6 m (241 ft)
- Beam: 7.6 m (25 ft)
- Draught: 6.4 m (21 ft)
- Propulsion: Pressurised water K48 nuclear reactor (48 MW (64,000 hp)), LEU 7%; 2 turbo-alternators; 1 electric motor (7 MW (9,400 hp)); one propeller; 1 diesel-alternator SEMT Pielstick 8 PA 4V 185 SM; one auxiliary engine, 5 MW (6,700 hp).
- Speed: over 25 knots (46 km/h; 29 mph)
- Endurance: 45 days
- Test depth: over 300 m (980 ft)
- Complement: 10 officers; 52 warrant officers; 8 petty officers
- Sensors & processing systems: DMUX 20 multifonction; ETBF DSUV 62C towed antenna; DRUA 33 radar
- Electronic warfare & decoys: ARUR 16
- Armament: 4 × 533 mm (21 in) torpedo tubes; total mixed load of 14; F17 mod2 torpedoes; 14 Exocet SM39 surface-to-surface missiles; mines

Saphir was a first-generation nuclear attack submarine of the French Navy. Saphir was the second of the Rubis series. The boat was originally to be named Bretagne, but the name was changed to Saphir before commissioning in 1981.

== Background and design ==
Silhouette before Améthyste rebuild

Silhouette after Améthyste rebuild

The Rubis class was the second attempt at constructing a nuclear-powered attack submarine. The first, also dubbed Rubis, had been authorised in 1964 but cancelled in 1968, just as the first boat was about to commence construction. However, a new naval plan in 1972, called Plan Bleu, stated a requirement for 20 attack submarines of both nuclear-powered and conventionally-powered types. The new design, designated Type SNA 72 and called a sous-marin nucléaire de chasse (French: hunter nuclear submarine) was smaller than any contemporary nuclear-powered attack submarine design in other major world navies. The small hull design was capable due the development of a compact, integrated nuclear reactor-exchanger with turbo-electric drives. Even then, the project was only considered feasible if equipped with weapons and sensors already in service, with the fire-control, torpedo-launching and submarine-detection systems also found in the Agosta class.

The first four submarines of the class, Rubis, Saphir, Casabianca, and Émeraude were built according to the original specifications. They measured 72.1 metres (236 ft 7 in) long overall with a beam of 7.6 m (24 ft 11 in) and a draught of 6.4 m (21 ft 0 in). The Rubis class had a standard displacement of 2,265 tonnes (2,229 long tons), 2,385 t (2,347 long tons) surfaced and 2,670 t (2,630 long tons) submerged. The boats are of single-hull construction made of 80 HLES high elasticity steel and the forward diving planes are situated high on the conning tower. The Rubis class can dive to depths over 300 m (980 ft).

The submarines are powered by a CAS-48 pressurised water nuclear reactor creating 48 megawatts utilising 7% low-enriched uranium, driving two 3,950-kilowatt turbo-alternator sets. These power a single propeller creating 7,100 kW (9,500 shp). At low speeds, the submarines use natural circulation to reduce noise emissions. In case of a reactor failure, the Rubises have an emergency electric motor powered by batteries or a SEMT-Pielstick 16PA4 diesel generator set with an output of 480 kW (640 hp; 650 PS). On battery power, the vessel has a range of 50 nautical miles (93 km; 58 mi) and endurance for 15 hours. The submarines had a cruising speed of 25 knots (46 km/h; 29 mph) and endurance of 45 days (60 days maximum). Alternating between two different crews, they have an active yearly service of 240 days. The crew initially numbered 66, including 9 officers.

Sharing sensors and weapons with the Agosta class, the Rubises have four 533-millimetre (21 in) torpedo tubes forward. They have stowage for a mix of 14 F17 Mod 2 torpedoes and SM39 Exocet anti-ship missiles. The submarines can fire and guide two torpedoes simultaneously. Instead of torpedoes, the submarine can embark FG 29 mines. The submarines was initially fitted with a DRUA 33 navigation/search radar, ARUR and ARUD electronic warfare systems, DSUV 22 multi-function passive sonar array, DUUA 2B active sonar, and DUUX 2 acoustic intercept sonar.

=== AMÉTHYSTE rebuild ===
The initial design of Rubis proved to be problematic with unexpectedly high noise levels. This led to the Améthyste silencing program (AMÉlioration Tactique HYdrodynamique Silence Transmission Ecoute, literally Silence-Transmission-Listening Hydrodynamic Tactical Improvement) which was applied during construction of the fifth (Améthyste) and sixth (Perle) hulls. The hull form was reshaped and lengthened to 73.6 m (241 ft 6 in) while the superstructure and external bow were made of glass-reinforced plastic. To further reduce noise emissions, the machinery was given flexible mountings. The program included upgrades to the sonar and additional upgrades of the electronics. The Rubis class had a DSUB 62C towed passive sonar array, DUUG 2 sonar intercept, DMUX 20 sonar suite installed and had their acoustic intercept upgraded to DUUX 5. With the upgrades tested and proven, the original four boats were rebuilt to the same standards between 1989 and 1995 and were nearly identical to the final two ships of the class.

== Service history ==
Between October 1989 and May 1991, the boat undertook a major refit which revolved around upgrades to the level of the lead vessel in the class, Améthyste.

In September 2001, the boat torpedoed and sank a target ship, the decommissioned destroyer D'Estrées, off Toulon.

On 6 March 2015 it was reported that in a later erased blogspot of the French Ministry of Defence that during a training exercise off Florida Saphir, in her role as part of the "enemy" attack group, had "sunk" the aircraft carrier USS Theodore Roosevelt and its escort.

After 35 years of active service, Saphir was decommissioned in July 2019, making her the first Rubis-class SSN to be decommissioned. Saphir will be replaced by a new Barracuda-class SSN. In October 2020 it was announced that the submarine Perle would be repaired using the forward section of her decommissioned sister Saphir. The repair was to begin in January 2021 with envisaged completion in 2023.

== Decorations ==
The fanion of Saphir and the men's boat were decorated with the Cross for Military Valour with bronze palm on June 5, 2012.

== See also ==
- List of submarines of France
