= Alain Oudot de Dainville =

French Navy officer (born 1947)

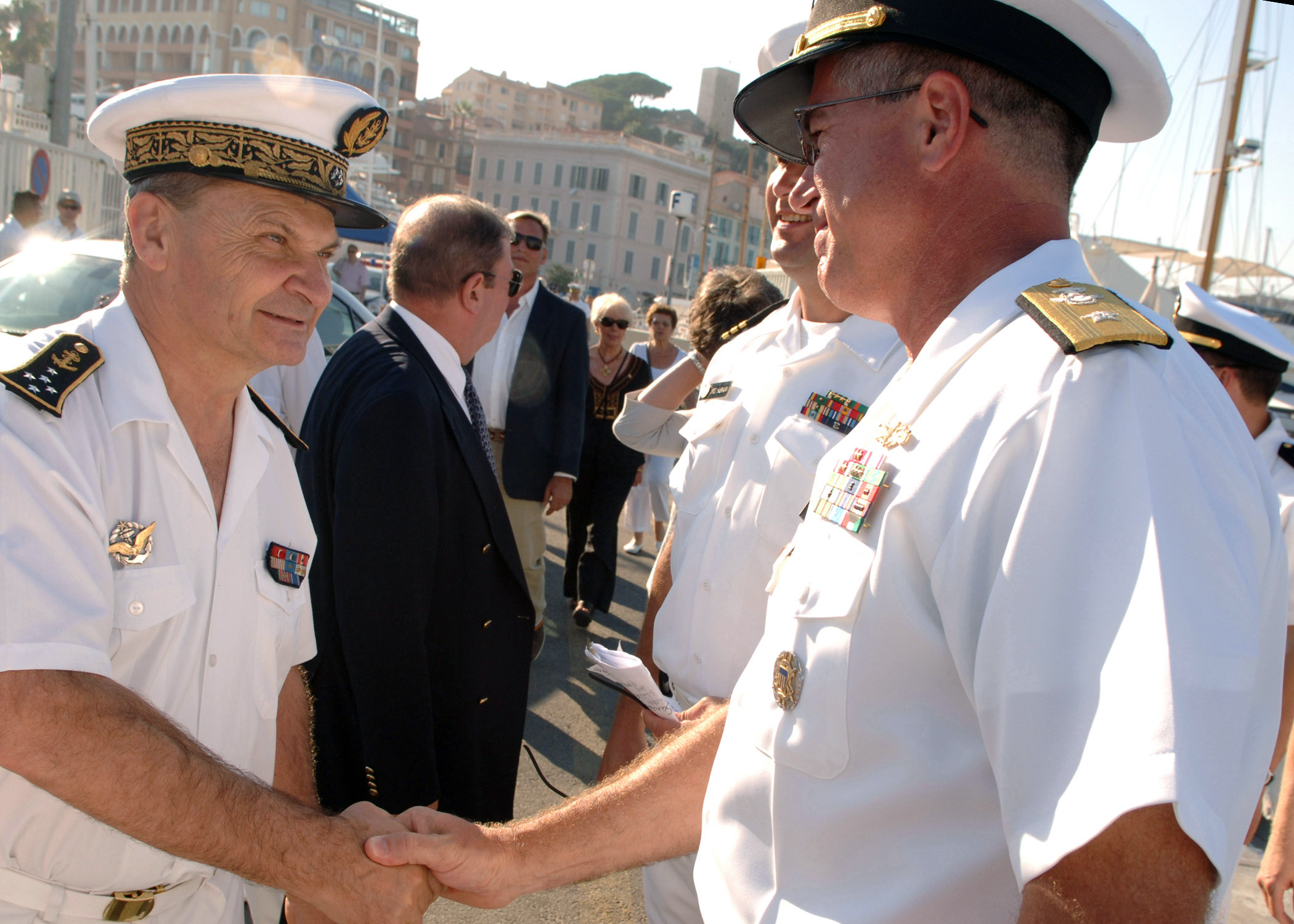
- Admiral Alain Oudot de Dainville (left)
- Born: 15 March 1947 (age 79); Marsat (Puy de Dôme
- Military career
- Allegiance: France
- Branch: French Navy
- Service years: 1980 –
- Rank: Vice Admiral
- Commands: Chief of Staff of the French Navy; Clemenceau
- Awards: Grand officier of the Légion d'Honneur; Commander of the Ordre National du Mérite

Admiral Alain Oudot de Dainville (French: [alɛ̃ udo də dɛ̃vil]; born 15 March 1947 in Marsat (Puy de Dôme)) is a French Navy officer. He was Chief of Staff of the French Navy from 2005 to 2008.

== Career ==
A former naval pilot, Oudot de Dainville was the commanding officer of the Clemenceau from 1993 to 1995.

Between 1995 and 1997, he directed the nuclear powered Charles de Gaulle aircraft carrier project. Since 1999, he held general staff position. He served as Chief of Staff of the French Navy from 2005 to 2008.

== Honours ==
- Grand officier of the Légion d'Honneur
- Commander of the Ordre National du Mérite

Military offices
Preceded by Jean-Louis Battet	Chief of Staff of the French Navy; 2005–2008	Succeeded by Pierre-François Forissier
