= French submarine Perle (S606) =

French nuclear-powered attack submarine

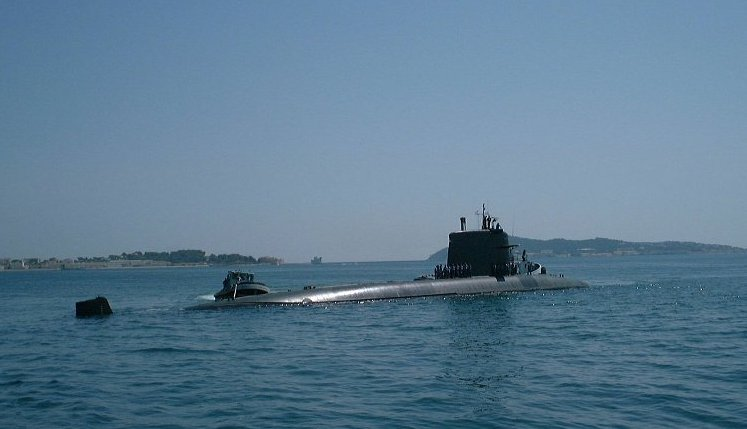

History

France
- Name: Perle
- Namesake: Pearl
- Laid down: 22 March 1987
- Launched: 22 September 1990
- Commissioned: 7 July 1993
- Decommissioned: 23 June 2026
- Home port: Toulon
- Status: Decommissioned

General characteristics
- Class & type: Rubis-class submarine
- Displacement: 2600+ t; 2400+ t surfaced
- Length: 74.6 m (244 ft 9 in)
- Beam: 7.6 m (24 ft 11 in)
- Draught: 6.4 m (21 ft 0 in)
- Propulsion: Pressurised water K48 nuclear reactor (48 MW), LEU 7%; 2 turbo-alternators; 1 electric engine (7 MW); one propeller; 1 diesel-alternators SEMT Pielstick 8 PA 4V 185 SM; one auxiliary engine, 5 MW.
- Speed: over 25 knots (46 km/h; 29 mph)
- Range: 8,500 nmi (15,700 km; 9,800 mi)
- Test depth: over 300 m (980 ft)
- Complement: 10 officers; 52 warrant officers; 8 petty officers
- Sensors & processing systems: DMUX 20 active/passive sonar; ETBF DSUV 62C towed array sonar; DSUV 22 passive cylindrical array sonar with active transducer; DRUA 33 radar
- Electronic warfare & decoys: ARUR 13
- Armament: 4 × 533 mm (21 in) tubes; total mixed load of 14; F17 mod2 torpedoes; 14 Exocet SM39; mines

Perle (French: [pɛʁl]; "Pearl") was a first-generation nuclear attack submarine of the French Navy. The boat was the sixth and last submarine of the Rubis series to be built. Construction on the submarine began on 27 March 1987. The boat was launched on 22 September 1990 and entered active duty service on 7 July 1993. She was decommissioned on 23 June 2026.

== Background and design ==
Silhouette before Améthyste rebuild

Silhouette after Améthyste rebuild

The Rubis class was the second attempt at constructing a nuclear-powered attack submarine. The first, also dubbed Rubis, had been authorised in 1964 but cancelled in 1968, just as the first boat was about to commence construction. However, a new naval plan in 1972, called Plan Bleu, stated a requirement for 20 attack submarines of both nuclear-powered and conventionally-powered types. The new design, designated Type SNA 72 and called a sous-marin nucléaire de chasse (French: hunter nuclear submarine) was smaller than any contemporary nuclear-powered attack submarine design in other major world navies. The small hull design was capable due the development of a compact, integrated nuclear reactor-exchanger with turbo-electric drives. Even then, the project was only considered feasible if equipped with weapons and sensors already in service, with the fire-control, torpedo-launching and submarine-detection systems also found in the Agosta class.

The first four submarines of the class, Rubis, Saphir, Casabianca, and Émeraude were built according to the original specifications. They measured 72.1 metres (236 ft 7 in) long overall with a beam of 7.6 m (24 ft 11 in) and a draught of 6.4 m (21 ft 0 in). The Rubis class had a standard displacement of 2,265 tonnes (2,229 long tons), 2,385 t (2,347 long tons) surfaced and 2,670 t (2,630 long tons) submerged. The boats are of single-hull construction made of 80 HLES high elasticity steel and the forward diving planes are situated high on the conning tower. The Rubis class can dive to depths over 300 m (980 ft).

The submarines are powered by a CAS-48 pressurised water nuclear reactor creating 48 megawatts utilising 7% low-enriched uranium, driving two 3,950-kilowatt turbo-alternator sets. These power a single propeller creating 7,100 kW (9,500 shp). At low speeds, the submarines use natural circulation to reduce noise emissions. In case of a reactor failure, the Rubises have an emergency electric motor powered by batteries or a SEMT-Pielstick 16PA4 diesel generator set with an output of 480 kW (640 hp; 650 PS). On battery power, the vessel has a range of 50 nautical miles (93 km; 58 mi) and endurance for 15 hours. The submarines had a cruising speed of 25 knots (46 km/h; 29 mph) and endurance of 45 days (60 days maximum). Alternating between two different crews, they have an active yearly service of 240 days. The crew initially numbered 66, including 9 officers.

Sharing sensors and weapons with the Agosta class, the Rubises have four 533-millimetre (21 in) torpedo tubes forward. They have stowage for a mix of 14 F17 Mod 2 torpedoes and SM39 Exocet anti-ship missiles. The submarines can fire and guide two torpedoes simultaneously. Instead of torpedoes, the submarine can embark FG 29 mines. The submarines was initially fitted with a DRUA 33 navigation/search radar, ARUR and ARUD electronic warfare systems, DSUV 22 multi-function passive sonar array, DUUA 2B active sonar, and DUUX 2 acoustic intercept sonar.

=== AMÉTHYSTE rebuild ===
The initial design of Rubis proved to be problematic with unexpectedly high noise levels. This led to the Améthyste silencing program (AMÉlioration Tactique HYdrodynamique Silence Transmission Ecoute, literally Silence-Transmission-Listening Hydrodynamic Tactical Improvement) which was applied during construction of the fifth (Améthyste) and sixth (Perle) hulls. The hull form was reshaped and lengthened to 73.6 m (241 ft 6 in) while the superstructure and external bow were made of glass-reinforced plastic. To further reduce noise emissions, the machinery was given flexible mountings. The program included upgrades to the sonar and additional upgrades of the electronics. The Rubis class had a DSUB 62C towed passive sonar array, DUUG 2 sonar intercept, DMUX 20 sonar suite installed and had their acoustic intercept upgraded to DUUX 5. With the upgrades tested and proven, the original four boats were rebuilt to the same standards between 1989 and 1995 and were nearly identical to the final two ships of the class.

== Service history ==
The boat was deployed in the Royal Navy Auriga 2010 exercise alongside seven Royal Navy warships and one United States Navy destroyer.

=== 2020 fire ===
On 12 June 2020 at 10:35 a.m., a fire started at bow of Perle, while in drydock for maintenance and repair at the military port of Toulon. The fire was reported as under control at 9:36 PM. Firefighters flooded the rear compartments of the submarine with foam. At least 30 specialist naval fighters and a fireboat were involved. There were no reported injuries in the fire. Since the submarine's 48 megawatt pressurized water nuclear reactor had been removed when it entered the drydock in January 2020, there was no risk of radioactive contamination.

In October 2020 it was announced that the submarine would be repaired using the forward section of her decommissioned sister boat, Saphir. The repair was to begin in January 2021 with envisaged completion in 2023.

In October 2021, the joining of the forward section of Saphir with Perle was said to have been completed and the submarine was transferred from the Cherbourg shipyard back to Toulon to resume her original refit where it had been interrupted by the June 2020 fire. The joining of the forward section of Saphir to Perle involved about 100,000 hours of study and more than 250,000 hours of work. At the end of the process, the submarine's displacement increased by 68 tonnes and her length by about one meter.

Perle was scheduled for continued work through 2022 with sea trials envisaged toward the end of the year and a return to operational service in the first half of 2023.

=== 2022 fire and return to operational service ===
While continuing refit in dry dock at the arsenal in Toulon, Perle experienced another fire on 26 September 2022. Prior to the fire, the submarine had been slated to return to service in the first quarter of 2023. On 17 November 2022, the submarine left dry dock to continue her tests prior to an envisaged start of sea trials. The submarine returned to sea in May 2023 for the start of post-refit sea trials. In July she was declared ready to return to a regular operational cycle in the fleet until 2028.

However, it was subsequently indicated that, notwitstanding her reconstruction, owing to faster than originally anticipated introduction of the successor Suffren-class submarines, Perle would now be retired by the middle of 2026. In May 2026, the submarine departed her base at Toulon for the final time to transit to Cherbourg in order to decommission. She was formally decommissioned on 23 June 2026.

== See also ==
- List of submarines of France

== Notes and references ==
=== Sources ===
- Sous-marin nucléaire d'attaque Perle netmarine.net
- Couhat, Jean Labayle, ed. (1986). Combat Fleets of the World 1986/87. Annapolis, Maryland: Naval Institute Press. ISBN 0-85368-860-5.
- Jordan, John (1995). "France". In Chumbley, Stephen (ed.). Conway's All The World's Fighting Ships 1947–1995. Annapolis, Maryland: Naval Institute Press. pp. 95–131. ISBN 1-55750-132-7.
- Saunders, Stephen, ed. (2009). Jane's Fighting Ships 2009–2010 (112 ed.). Alexandria, Virginia: Jane's Information Group Inc. ISBN 978-0-7106-2888-6.
- Wertheim, Eric, ed. (2013). The Naval Institute Guide to Combat Fleets of the World (16th ed.). Annapolis, Maryland: Naval Institute Press. ISBN 9-7-815911-4954-5.
