= French submarine Rubis (S601) =

1979 Rubis-class submarine

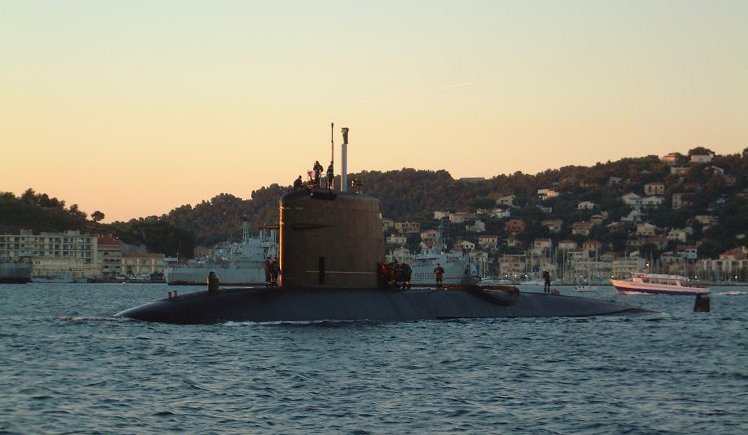

History

France
- Laid down: 11 December 1976
- Launched: 7 July 1979
- Christened: as Provence
- Commissioned: 23 February 1983
- Decommissioned: 2 December 2022
- Renamed: renamed Rubis in 1993
- Home port: Toulon
- Status: Decommissioned

General characteristics
- Class & type: Rubis-class submarine
- Displacement: 2600 t (2400 t surfaced)
- Length: 73.6 m (241 ft 6 in)
- Beam: 7.6 m (24 ft 11 in)
- Draught: 6.4 m (21 ft 0 in)
- Propulsion: Pressurised water K48 nuclear reactor (48 MW), LEU 7%; 2 turbo-alternators; 1 electric engine (7 MW); one propeller; 1 diesel-alternators SEMT Pielstick 8 PA 4V 185 SM; one auxiliary engine, 5 MW.
- Speed: over 25 knots (46 km/h; 29 mph)
- Endurance: 45 days
- Test depth: over 300 m (980 ft)
- Complement: 10 officers; 52 officiers mariniers; 8 quartiers-maîtres and seamen
- Sensors & processing systems: DMUX 20 multifonction; ETBF DSUV 62C towed antenna; DSUV 22 microphone system; DRUA 33 radar
- Electronic warfare & decoys: ARUR 16
- Armament: 4 × 533 mm (21.0 in) tubes.; total mixed load of 14; F17 mod2 torpedoes; 14 Exocet SM39; mines

Rubis (S601), initially named Provence, was a first-generation nuclear attack submarine and lead boat of the Rubis class of the French Navy, assigned to the attack nuclear submarine squadron.

== Background and design ==
Silhouette before Améthyste rebuild

Silhouette after Améthyste rebuild

The Rubis class was the second attempt at constructing a nuclear-powered attack submarine. The first, also dubbed Rubis, had been authorised in 1964 but cancelled in 1968, just as the first boat was about to commence construction. However, a new naval plan in 1972, called Plan Bleu, stated a requirement for 20 attack submarines of both nuclear-powered and conventionally-powered types. The new design, designated Type SNA 72 and called a sous-marin nucléaire de chasse (French: hunter nuclear submarine) was smaller than any contemporary nuclear-powered attack submarine design in other major world navies. The small hull design was capable due the development of a compact, integrated nuclear reactor-exchanger with turbo-electric drives. Even then, the project was only considered feasible if equipped with weapons and sensors already in service, with the fire-control, torpedo-launching and submarine-detection systems also found in the Agosta class.

The first four submarines of the class, Rubis, Saphir, Casabianca, and Émeraude were built according to the original specifications. They measured 72.1 metres (236 ft 7 in) long overall with a beam of 7.6 m (24 ft 11 in) and a draught of 6.4 m (21 ft 0 in). The Rubis class had a standard displacement of 2,265 tonnes (2,229 long tons), 2,385 t (2,347 long tons) surfaced and 2,670 t (2,630 long tons) submerged. The boats are of single-hull construction made of 80 HLES high elasticity steel and the forward diving planes are situated high on the conning tower. The Rubis class can dive to depths over 300 m (980 ft).

The submarines are powered by a CAS-48 pressurised water nuclear reactor creating 48 megawatts utilising 7% low-enriched uranium, driving two 3,950-kilowatt turbo-alternator sets. These power a single propeller creating 7,100 kW (9,500 shp). At low speeds, the submarines use natural circulation to reduce noise emissions. In case of a reactor failure, the Rubises have an emergency electric motor powered by batteries or a SEMT-Pielstick 16PA4 diesel generator set with an output of 480 kW (640 hp; 650 PS). On battery power, the vessel has a range of 50 nautical miles (93 km; 58 mi) and endurance for 15 hours. The submarines had a cruising speed of 25 knots (46 km/h; 29 mph) and endurance of 45 days (60 days maximum). Alternating between two different crews, they have an active yearly service of 240 days. The crew initially numbered 66, including 9 officers.

Sharing sensors and weapons with the Agosta class, the Rubises have four 533-millimetre (21 in) torpedo tubes forward. They have stowage for a mix of 14 F17 Mod 2 torpedoes and SM39 Exocet anti-ship missiles. The submarines can fire and guide two torpedoes simultaneously. Instead of torpedoes, the submarine can embark FG 29 mines. The submarines was initially fitted with a DRUA 33 navigation/search radar, ARUR and ARUD electronic warfare systems, DSUV 22 multi-function passive sonar array, DUUA 2B active sonar, and DUUX 2 acoustic intercept sonar.

=== AMÉTHYSTE rebuild ===
The initial design of Rubis proved to be problematic with unexpectedly high noise levels. This led to the Améthyste silencing program (AMÉlioration Tactique HYdrodynamique Silence Transmission Ecoute, literally Silence-Transmission-Listening Hydrodynamic Tactical Improvement) which was applied during construction of the fifth (Améthyste) and sixth (Perle) hulls. The hull form was reshaped and lengthened to 73.6 m (241 ft 6 in) while the superstructure and external bow were made of glass-reinforced plastic. To further reduce noise emissions, the machinery was given flexible mountings. The program included upgrades to the sonar and additional upgrades of the electronics. The Rubis class had a DSUB 62C towed passive sonar array, DUUG 2 sonar intercept, DMUX 20 sonar suite installed and had their acoustic intercept upgraded to DUUX 5. With the upgrades tested and proven, the original four boats were rebuilt to the same standards between 1989 and 1995 and were nearly identical to the final two ships of the class.

== Service history ==
The submarine was originally namesaked Provence and was renamed Rubis on 18 December 1980. Being the lead ship of the class, fine-tuning was long, notably needing over 1,000 hours of underwater testing before commissioning. Rubis was fielded on 11 December 1976 and launched on 7 July 1979.

The Rubis commenced active service on 23 February 1983. In 1985 she evacuated three Directorate-General for External Security (DGSE) agents who sailed to New Zealand on the yacht Ouvéa to participate in the bombing of Rainbow Warrior, then scuttled their yacht.

Later in 1991, the Rubis formed part of the French naval contribution to the Gulf War. Between September 1992 and July 1993, Rubis undertook a major refitting which upgraded her to the level of the Améthyste. Soon after, on 17 July 1993, Rubis collided with the tanker Lyria, as the Rubis was surfacing, causing minor damage and injuries. On 18 July 1996, the fourragère of the Ordre de la Libération was awarded to the submarine and the crew, as a legacy of the Rubis of the Second World War, which had been awarded the medal.

The Rubis also took part in Operation Trident, the 1999 bombing campaign over Yugoslavia, by protecting the aeronaval group. Along with the Améthyste, the boat was one of the two submarines who interdicted the Kotor straits to the Serbian Navy, thus effectively forbidding its use. The boat also gathered information for the coalition.

In 2002, the Rubis protected Task Force 473 in the Indian Ocean, during Operation Hercules, the naval part of the invasion of Afghanistan.

On 30 March 2007, while submerged, Rubis hit the bottom, damaging her bow and sonar. The boat returned to operations in July 2008.

Rubis was expected to be decommissioned in the beginning of 2017 but underwent modernization and returned to service in 2019. She was then scheduled to be withdrawn from service toward the end of 2022. In the summer of 2022 the boat undertook its final operational mission. She was decommissioned in Cherbourg on 2 December 2022.

== Awards and honours ==
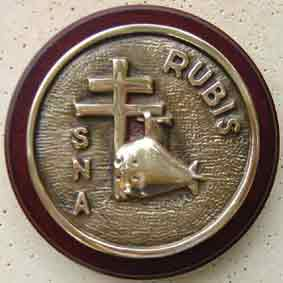
Tampion of the Rubis

Since 5 June 2012, the fanion of Rubis was decorated with the Cross for Military Valour with one palm.

== See also ==
- List of submarines of France

== References and notes ==
=== Sources ===
- Couhat, Jean Labayle, ed. (1986). Combat Fleets of the World 1986/87. Annapolis, Maryland: Naval Institute Press. ISBN 0-85368-860-5.
- Jordan, John (1995). "France". In Chumbley, Stephen (ed.). Conway's All The World's Fighting Ships 1947–1995. Annapolis, Maryland: Naval Institute Press. pp. 95–131. ISBN 1-55750-132-7.
- Saunders, Stephen, ed. (2009). Jane's Fighting Ships 2009–2010 (112 ed.). Alexandria, Virginia: Jane's Information Group Inc. ISBN 978-0-7106-2888-6.
- Wertheim, Eric, ed. (2013). The Naval Institute Guide to Combat Fleets of the World (16th ed.). Annapolis, Maryland: Naval Institute Press. ISBN 9-7-815911-4954-5.
