= Plan Bleu =

Cold War-era plan of the French Navy

Plan Bleu's initial vision for the French fleet in 1985
Type	Number
Aircraft carriers	2
Helicopter carriers	2
Frigates/corvettes	30
Avisos	35
Ballistic submarines	6
Fleet submarines	20
Fast attack craft	30
Minesweepers	36
Logistic vessels	5
Amphibious vessels	2
Aircraft	50

Plan Bleu was a shipbuilding effort by the French Navy proposed in 1972 to reform and modernize the fleet by 1985. Ordered as a 15-year procurement plan under Georges Pompidou, it was intended to bolster the surface fleet to avoid obsolescence and over-emphasis on ballistic missile submarines. However, a lack of funds and continued emphasis on submarines forced the plan to be reduced, with many of the envisioned ships cancelled.

== Development ==
In 1969, French Premier Charles de Gaulle retired. His successor, Georges Pompidou, reiterated de Gaulle's policy of autonomy from NATO and a comprehensive French military. In 1972, Pompidou ordered the French Navy, Air Force, and Army to plan out the next 15 years of procurement. The French Navy (Marine Nationale) was eager to use the opportunity to modernize, as the post-World War II surface fleet built during the 1950s risked bulk obsolescence. De Gaulle emphasized developing ballistic missile submarines to establish a French nuclear deterrence independent from the United States, which left less funds to modernize the conventional fleet. Previous five-year plans fell apart due to a lack of money and will, and the Navy intended to use the 15-year plan to envision the size and form of the entire fleet.

The resulting plan was named Plan Bleu. The accompanying doctrine reaffirmed de Gaulle-era policy—maintain a sea-based nuclear deterrent, operate an ocean-going fleet, and defend waters around France—but differed in regards to French overseas territories. While previous policy was to maintain an active presence in the territories, it was reformed to only require the capability to defend the territories. The change occurred after France lost most of its colonies in Africa and Asia, but maintained a fleet in the Indian Ocean.

== Composition ==
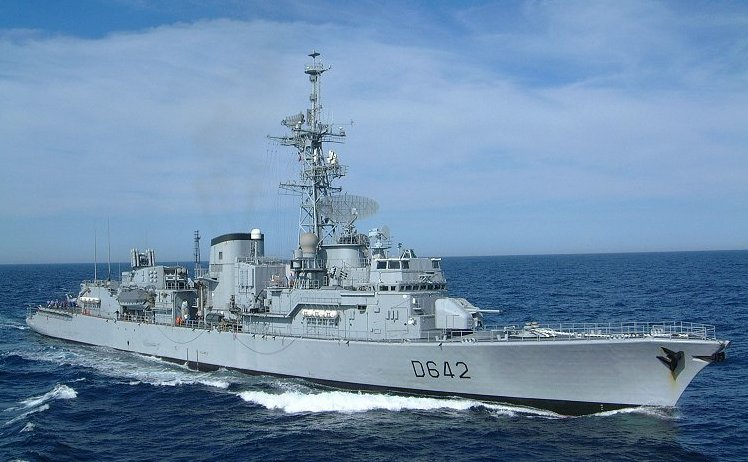
A Georges Leygues-class frigate, which was intended to replace older French anti-submarine surface escorts

By 1985, Plan Bleu envisioned the French Navy operating two aircraft carriers, two helicopter carriers, and 300,000 tons worth of escorts and logistical vessels, including six ballistic missile submarines and 20 fleet submarines. Older surface escorts—the T 47, T 53, and T 56-class destroyers—were to be replaced by the Georges Leygues-class frigate split in two sub-designs that emphasized anti-submarine or anti-air warfare. Existing conventionally-powered submarines were to be replaced by nuclear-powered boats, and the D'Estienne d'Orves-class aviso were ordered for patrol and coastal anti-submarine operations.

== Impact ==
Plan Bleu was approved by the National Assembly on 29 February 1972, but did not progress further in parliament. The primary issues were a lack of governmental funds due to France's economic situation and continued prioritization of ballistic missile submarines. Plan Bleu was first of the military's plans to be published, and the political push back caused the Ministry of Defence to keep the Army and Air Force's plans secret.

In June 1977, one carrier, eight fleet submarines, and eight avisos were struck from the plan. Two resulting five-year construction plans, one starting in 1971 and another in 1977, did not meet the expectation required by Plan Bleu as construction of submarines and escorts fell even shorter. Over the next decade, Plan Bleu was seen as overly optimistic, with many of the planned ships simplified or cancelled. Work on new helicopter carriers were designated PH 75 and abandoned by the late 1980s, and what was intended to be 30 new fast attack craft entered service as four Trident-class patrol boats which were too small for their intended use. Of the initial 24 Georges Leygues-class frigates planned, only seven anti-submarine and two Cassard-class anti-air frigates were completed. The failure of Plan Bleu was in line with similar long-term development plans of the French military, with a successor, Plan Marine 2000, having a similar fate.
