= F17 torpedo =

DTCN F17
- Type: Heavyweight ASuW torpedo
- Place of origin: France

Production history
- Manufacturer: Direction Technique des Constructions Navales

Specifications
- Mass: 1410 kg
- Length: 5.9m (19.4ft)
- Diameter: 550 mm (21.65 in)
- Maximum firing range: 18 km
- Warhead: HE: 250kg (551 lbs)
- Engine: Electric, silver-zinc oxide batteries
- Maximum speed: 35 knots (65 km/h; 40 mph)
- Guidance system: wire-guided and passive terminal homing
- Launch platform: ships, submarines

The DTCN F17 was a wire-guided anti-surface ship torpedo originally produced in 1971. France, Spain, and Saudi Arabia were its primary users. As of 2021, there were still used on Pakistan Navy's Hashmat-class submarines.

A control panel above the launch platform allowed for instantaneous switching between two modes, wire-guided or autonomous passive homing.
