= List of cruise missiles =

The following is a list of cruise missiles. It does not include the specifically anti-ship missiles, which are at List of anti-ship missiles.

Missile	Type	Country	Max. range	Max. Speed (Mach)	Mass	Warhead	Warhead type	Status	Note
AV-TM 300	Surface-to-surface missile	Brazil	300 km (190 mi)	0.85	1,140 kg (2,510 lb)	200 kg (440 lb)	?	Under development	
Apache	Air-to-surface, anti-runway	France	140 km (87 mi)	0.8	1,230 kg (2,710 lb)	560 kg (1,230 lb)	Conventional, 10 sub-munitions	Decommissioned	
ASMP	Air-to-surface, nuclear cruise missile	France	300 km (190 mi)	3.0	860 kg (1,900 lb)	100 to 300 kt (TNT equivalent)	TN 81 variable yield nuclear warhead	Decommissioned	
ASMP-A	Air-to-surface, nuclear cruise missile	France	500 km (310 mi)	3.0	860 kg (1,900 lb)	300 kt (TNT equivalent)	TNA nuclear warhead	In service	
ASN4G	Air-to-surface, nuclear, hypersonic cruise missile	France	?	4.0–5.0	?	300 kt (TNT equivalent)	TNA nuclear warhead	Under development	
MdCN	Ship-to-surface and submarine to surface, land attack	France	1,000 km (620 mi)	0.8	1,400 kg (3,100 lb)	250 kg (550 lb)	Conventional, HE penetration	In service	
FC/ASW (Perseus)	Anti-ship & Land-attack missile	France / Italy / UK	300 km (190 mi)	5.0	800 kg (1,800 lb)	1 × 200 kg (440 lb) + 2 × 50 kg (110 lb)	Conventional	Under development	Lateral bay with 2 submunitions
Black Shaheen	Air-to-surface	France /UAE	290 km (180 mi)	0.95	1,300 kg (2,900 lb)	450 kg (990 lb)	Conventional, HE penetration	In service	SCALP-EG export derivative
SCALP-EG / Storm shadow	Air-to-surface	France / UK	560 km (350 mi)	0.80	1,300 kg (2,900 lb)	450 kg (990 lb)	Conventional, HE penetration	In service	
JFS-M (Joint Fire Support Missile)	Surface-to-surface, loitering capability	Germany	499 km (310 mi)	0.90	?	?	Conventional	Under development	
Taurus KEPD-350	Air-to-surface	Germany / Sweden	500 km (310 mi) +	0.95	1,400 kg (3,100 lb)	481 kg (1,060 lb)	Conventional, HE penetration	In service	
V-1	Surface-to-surface	Nazi Germany	250 km (160 mi) +	0.52	2,150 kg (4,740 lb)	850 kg (1,870 lb)	Conventional	Decommissioned	
BrahMos	Anti-ship missile, Land-attack missile, Surface-to-surface missile, Submarine-launched cruise missile	India / Russia	600 km (370 mi)	3.0 +	700 kg (1,500 lb)	700 kg (1,500 lb)700 kg (1,500 lb)	Nuclear and conventional (semi-armour-piercing warhead or submunitions)	In service	
BrahMos-A	Air-launched cruise missile	India / Russia	500 km (310 mi)	3.0	2,500 kg (5,500 lb)	Armour piercing: 300 kg (660 lb); Sub-munition: 250 kg (550 lb)	Nuclear and conventional (semi-armour-piercing warhead or submunitions)	In service	
BrahMos-II	Hypersonic Cruise missile Air-launched cruise missile Anti-ship missile Land-attack missile Surface-to-surface missile	India / Russia	1,000 km (620 mi)	8.0	?	?	?	Under development	
BrahMos-NG	Next Generation Air-launched cruise missile Land-attack missile Anti-ship missile	India	290 km (180 mi)	3.5	?	?	?	Under development	
Nirbhay	Subsonic Cruise missile	India	1,500 km (930 mi)	0.9	1,500 kg (3,300 lb)	300 kg (660 lb)	?	In service	
Abu Mahdi	Anti-ship cruise missile Land-attack missile	Iran	1,000 km (620 mi)	0.9	?	?	?	In service	
Ghadir	Anti-ship cruise missile	Iran	600 km (370 mi)	0.9	?	?	?	In service	
Hoveyzeh	Land-attack cruise missile	Iran	1,350 km (840 mi)	0.9	?	?	?	In service	
Paveh	Land-attack cruise missile	Iran	1,650 km (1,030 mi)	0.9	?	?	?	In service	
Qader	Anti-ship cruise missile	Iran	300 km (190 mi)	0.9	?	200 kg (440 lb)	?	In service	
Soumar	Land-attack cruise missile	Iran	750 km (470 mi)	0.9	?	?	?	In service	
Ya-Ali	Air-to-surface missile	Iran	700 km (430 mi)	0.9	?	?	?	In service	
Delilah	Air-to-surface missile	Israel	250 km (160 mi) +	0.7	187 kg (412 lb)	30 kg (66 lb)	Conventional, insensitive explosive	In service	
Popeye (missile)	Air-to-surface missile Submarine-launched cruise missile	Israel	320 km (200 mi)	?	?	340 kg (750 lb)	?	In service	
Sea Breaker	Anti-ship & Land-attack missile	Israel	300 km (190 mi)	High subsonic	400 kg (880 lb)	113 kg (249 lb)	Conventional, insensitive explosive	Under development	
TESEO MK2/E	Ship-to-surface Anti-ship & Land-attack missile	Italy	350 km (220 mi) +	?	700 kg (1,500 lb)	200 kg (440 lb)	Conventional, insensitive explosive	Under development	
Hwasal-1	Land-attack cruise missile	North Korea	1,500 km (930 mi)	?	?	?	?	In service	
Hwasal-2	Land-attack cruise missile	North Korea	2,000 km (1,200 mi)	?	?	?	?	In service	
Kumsong-3 (KN-19)	Anti-ship cruise missile	North Korea	250 km (160 mi)	?	?	?	?	In service	
Joint Strike Missile	Air-to-surface	Norway / United States	550 km (340 mi)	0.90	416 kg (917 lb)	125 kg (276 lb)	Conventional, HE blast-fragmentation	In service	
Babur-1	Surface to Surface	Pakistan	700 km (430 mi)	0.8	1,500 kg (3,300 lb)	500 kg (1,100 lb)	?	In service	
Babur-1B	Surface to Surface	Pakistan	900 km (560 mi)	0.8	1,500 kg (3,300 lb)	500 kg (1,100 lb)	?	In service	
Babur-3	Submarine launched Sea to Surface	Pakistan	450 km (280 mi)	0.8	1,500 kg (3,300 lb)	500 kg (1,100 lb)	?	In service	
Harbah	Sea to Surface, Anti Ship missile	Pakistan	750 km (470 mi)	0.8	1,500 kg (3,300 lb)	500 kg (1,100 lb)	?	In service	
Ra'ad Mk-1	Air to Surface	Pakistan	350 km (220 mi)	0.8	1,100 kg (2,400 lb)	500 kg (1,100 lb)	?	In service	
Ra'ad MK-2	Air to Surface	Pakistan	600 km (370 mi)	0.8	1,100 kg (2,400 lb)	500 kg (1,100 lb)	?	Under development	
Zarb missile	Sea to Surface, Surface to Sea, Surface to Surface	Pakistan	320 km (200 mi)	0.8	-	500 kg (1,100 lb)	?	In service	
3M-54 Kalibr	Cruise missile Anti-ship missile Submarine-launched cruise missile Surface-to-surface missile	Russia	2,500 km (1,600 mi)	0.8	?	400 kg (880 lb) – 500 kg (1,100 lb)	?	In service	
9M730 Burevestnik	Surface-to-surface missile	Russia	Unlimited (nuclear powered)	1.21	5,000–6,000 kg	Variable, 100 KT to 1 MT (TNT equivalent)	Thermonuclear	In service	In service as of 26 Oct 2025.
Geran-5	Surface-to-surface missile	Russia	1,000 km (620 mi)	0.49	850 kg (1,870 lb)	90 kg (200 lb)	Conventional	In service	
Kh-101	Air to Surface	Russia	4,500 km (2,800 mi)	1.03	2,400 kg (5,300 lb)	400 kg (880 lb)	?	In service	
P-700 Granit	Anti-ship missile	Russia	625 km (388 mi)	2.5 +	7,000 kg (15,000 lb)	750 kg (1,650 lb)	?	In service	
P-800 Oniks	Anti-ship missile	Russia	600 km (370 mi)	2.5	3,000 kg (6,600 lb)	250 kg (550 lb)	?	In service	
Hyunmoo-3	?	South Korea	500 km (310 mi) – 1,500 km (930 mi)	1.2	1,500 kg (3,300 lb)	450 kg (990 lb) – 500 kg (1,100 lb)	?	In service	
Hsiung Feng IIE (HF-2E)	Surface-to-surface land-attack cruise missile	Taiwan	600 km (370 mi) to2,000 km (1,200 mi)	0.85	1,600 kg (3,500 lb)	220 kg (490 lb) to 450 kg (990 lb)	Conventional, HE penetration	In service	
Atmaca	Surface-to-surface missile, Anti-ship Cruise Missile	Turkey	250 km (160 mi)	0.85–0.90	800 kg (1,800 lb)	250 kg (550 lb)	?	In service	
Baykar Kemankeş 1	Air to Surface cruise missile	Turkey	150 km (93 mi)	0.30	40 kg (88 lb)	5 kg (11 lb)	Conventional, HE penetration	Under development	
Baykar Kemankeş 2	Air to Surface cruise missile	Turkey	180 km (110 mi)	0.27	70 kg (150 lb)	20 kg (44 lb)	Conventional, HE penetration	Under development	
Çakır (missile)	Air to Surface, Surface-to-surface missile, Anti-ship Cruise Missile	Turkey	150 km (93 mi) +	0.75–0.85	275 kg (606 lb)	70 kg (150 lb)	?	Under development	
Gezgin	Surface-to-surface missile, Anti-ship Cruise Missile	Turkey	800 km (500 mi) – 1,400 km (870 mi)	0.90–0.95	1,500 kg (3,300 lb)	?	?	Under development	
SOM (missile)	Air to Surface, Anti-ship missile	Turkey	250 km (160 mi)	0.94	600 kg (1,300 lb)	230 kg (510 lb)	?	In service	
FP-5 Flamingo	Surface-to-surface missile	Ukraine	3,000 km (1,900 mi)	0.77	6,000 kg (13,000 lb)	1,150 kg (2,540 lb)	?	In service	
R-360 Neptune	Anti-ship cruise missile	Ukraine	300 km (190 mi)	subsonic	870 kg (1,920 lb)	150 kg (330 lb)	?	In service	
Trembita	Surface-to-surface missile	Ukraine	140 km (87 mi)	0.4	100 kg (220 lb)	25 kg (55 lb)	?	In service	
BRAKESTOP	Surface-to-surface missile	United Kingdom	500–600 km (310–370 mi)	?	?	200–300 kg (440–660 lb)	Conventional	Under development	
AGM-28 Hound Dog	Supersonic, turbojet-propelled, air-launched cruise missile	United States	1,263 km (785 mi)	2.1	4,603 kg (10,148 lb)	790 kg (1,740 lb)	W28 Class D nuclear	Decommissioned	
AGM-86 ALCM	Air to Surface	United States	2,400 km (1,500 mi) +	0.73	1,950 kg (4,300 lb)	1,362 kg (3,003 lb)	?	In service	
AGM-129 ACM	Air to Surface	United States	3,700 km (2,300 mi)	0.65	1,300 kg (2,900 lb)	130 kg (290 lb)	?	Decommissioned	
AGM-158 JASSM	Air to Surface	United States	1,000 km (620 mi)	0.8 -	1,021 kg (2,251 lb)	450 kg (990 lb)	?	In service	
AGM-188 Rusty Dagger	Air-to-surface	United States	930 km (580 mi) at least	0.6 at least	225 kg (496 lb)	45 kg (99 lb)	Multi-purpose warhead	Under development	
GAM-63 RASCAL	Supersonic air-to-surface	United States	161 km (100 mi)	2.54	8,255 kg (18,199 lb)	1,500 kg (3,300 lb)	W-27 nuclear		
MGM-1 Matador	Surface-to-surface missile	United States	400 km (250 mi) /1,000 km (620 mi)	0.85	5,400 kg (11,900 lb)	1,400 kg (3,100 lb)	W-5 nuclear	Decommissioned	
MGM-13 Mace	Surface-to-surface missile	United States	2,300 km (1,400 mi)	0.85	8,500 kg (18,700 lb)	930 kg (2,050 lb)	W28 thermonuclear	Decommissioned	
SM-62 Snark	Surface-to-surface missile, intercontinental	United States	10,200 km (6,300 mi)	0.85	27,000 kg (60,000 lb)	3,060 kg (6,750 lb)	W39 thermonuclear	Decommissioned	
SSM-N-8 Regulus	Submarine launched Sea to Surface	United States	926 km (575 mi)	< 1.0	6,207 kg (13,684 lb)	1,400 kg (3,100 lb)	W27 thermonuclear	Decommissioned	
SSM-N-9 Regulus II	Submarine launched Sea to Surface	United States	1,852 km (1,151 mi)	2.0	10,000 kg (22,000 lb)	1,300 kg (2,900 lb)	W27 thermonuclear	Decommissioned	
Tomahawk (missile family)	Surface-to-surface missile	United States	1,300 km (810 mi) – 2,500 km (1,600 mi)	0.72	1,300 kg (2,900 lb) – 1,600 kg (3,500 lb)	450 kg (990 lb)	?	In service	
Quds 1	Surface-to-surface missile	Houthis	700 km (430 mi)	– 500 km (310 mi)	0.72	300 kg (660 lb) – 300 kg (660 lb)	200 kg (440 lb)	?	In service
DR-3	Surface-to-surface missile	Hezbollah/Syria	?					In service	Based on the Soviet Tu-143
