= Strategic bomber =

Type of military aircraft

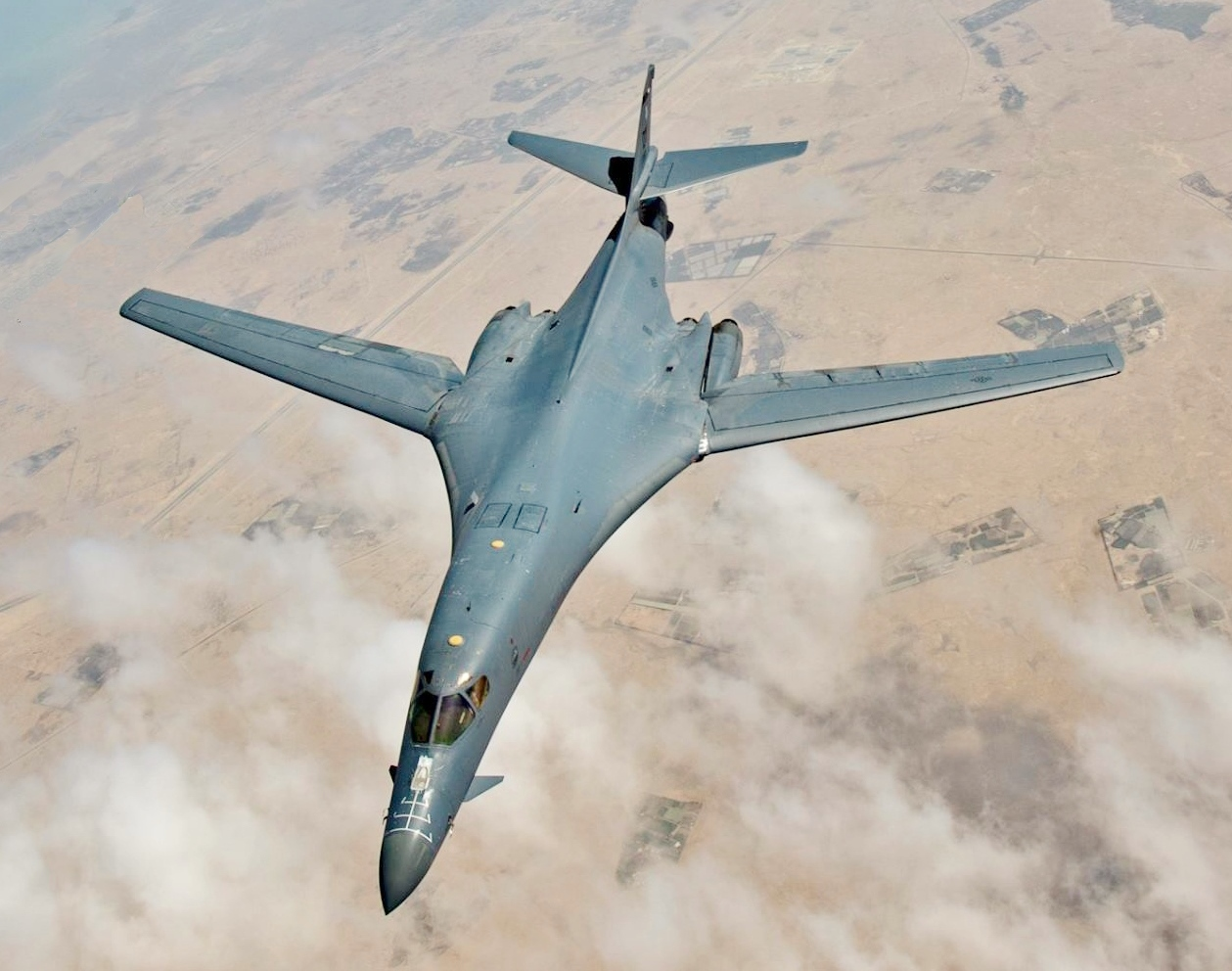
A contemporary U.S. Air Force strategic bomber, the Rockwell B-1B Lancer

A strategic bomber is a medium-to-long-range bomber aircraft designed to drop large amounts of air-to-ground weaponry onto a distant target for the purposes of debilitating the enemy's capacity to wage war. Unlike tactical bombers, penetrators, fighter-bombers, and attack aircraft, which are used in air interdiction operations to attack enemy combatants and military equipment, strategic bombers are designed to fly into enemy territory to destroy strategic targets (e.g., infrastructure, logistics, military installations, factories, etc.). In addition to strategic bombing, strategic bombers can be used for tactical missions. There are currently only three countries that operate strategic heavy bombers: the United States, Russia and China.

The modern strategic bomber role appeared after strategic bombing was widely employed, and atomic bombs were first used during World War II. Nuclear strike missions (i.e., delivering nuclear-armed missiles or bombs) can potentially be carried out by most modern fighter-bombers and strike fighters, even at intercontinental range, with the use of aerial refueling, so any nation possessing this combination of equipment and techniques theoretically has such capability. Primary delivery aircraft for a modern strategic bombing mission need not always necessarily be a heavy bomber type, and any modern aircraft capable of nuclear strikes at long range is equally able to carry out tactical missions with conventional weapons. An example is France's Mirage IV, a small strategic bomber replaced in service by the ASMP-equipped Mirage 2000N fighter-bomber and Rafale multirole fighter.

As of 2025, the United States Air Force is the largest operator with 130 strategic bombers in active service, between the B-52 Stratofortress, B-1 Lancer, and Northrop B-2 Spirit. The People's Liberation Army is second with 120 Xi'an H-6 bombers, and the Russian Air Force third, with 119 bombers between its Tu-95, Tu-22M, and Tu-160.

== History ==
=== First and Second World Wars ===
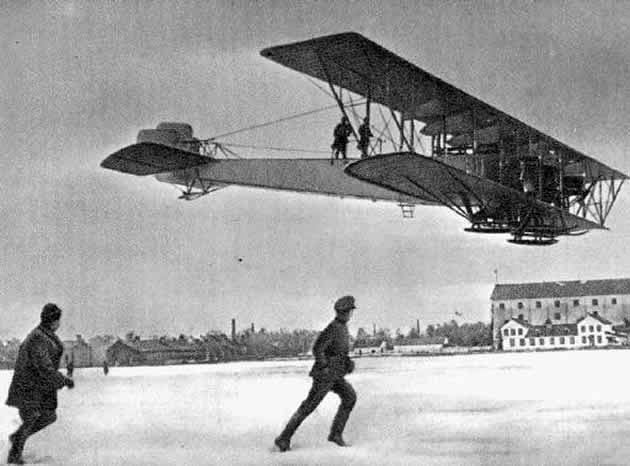
The Sikorsky Ilya Muromets was designed by Igor Sikorsky as the first ever airliner, but it was turned into a bomber by the Imperial Russian Air Force.

The first strategic bombing efforts took place during World War I (1914–18), by the Russians with their Sikorsky Ilya Muromets bomber (the first heavy four-engine aircraft), and by the Germans using Zeppelins or long-range multi-engine Gotha aircraft. Zeppelins reached England on bombing raids by 1916, forcing the British to create extensive defense systems including some of the first anti-aircraft guns which were often used with searchlights to highlight the enemy machines overhead. Late in the war, American fliers under the command of Brig. Gen. Billy Mitchell were developing multi-aircraft "mass" bombing missions behind German lines, although the Armistice ended full realization of what was being planned.

Study of strategic bombing continued in the interwar years. Many books and articles predicted a fearful prospect for any future war, paced by political fears such as those expressed by British Prime Minister Stanley Baldwin who told the House of Commons early in the 1930s that "the bomber will always get through" no matter what defensive systems were undertaken. It was widely believed by the late 1930s that strategic "terror" bombing of cities in any war would quickly result in devastating losses and might decide a conflict in a matter of days or weeks. But theory far exceeded what most air forces could actually put into the air. Germany focused on short-range tactical bombers. Britain's Royal Air Force began developing four-engine long-range bombers only in the late 1930s. The U.S. Army Air Corps (Army Air Forces as of mid-1941) was severely limited by small budgets in the late 1930s, and only barely saved the B-17 bomber that would soon be vital. The equally important B-24 first flew in 1939. Both aircraft would constitute the bulk of the bomber force for USAAF strategic bombing in Europe and Allied day bomber units more generally.

At the start of World War II, so-called "strategic" bombing was initially carried out by medium bomber aircraft which were typically twin-engined, armed with several defensive guns, but only possessed limited bomb-carrying capacity and range. Both Britain and the US were developing larger two- and four-engined designs, which began to replace or supplement the smaller aircraft by 1941–42. After American entry into the war in December 1941, the U.S. 8th Air Force began to develop a daylight bombing capacity using improved B-17 and B-24 four-engine aircraft. In order to assemble the formations to carry out these bombing campaigns, assembly ships were used to quickly form defensive combat boxes. The RAF concentrated its efforts on night bombing. But neither force was able to develop adequate bombsights or tactics to allow for often-bragged "pinpoint" accuracy. The post-war U.S. Strategic Bombing Survey studies supported the overall notion of strategic bombing, but underlined many of its shortcomings as well. Attempts to create pioneering examples of "smart bombs" resulted in the Azon ordnance, deployed in the European Theater and CBI Theater from B-24s.

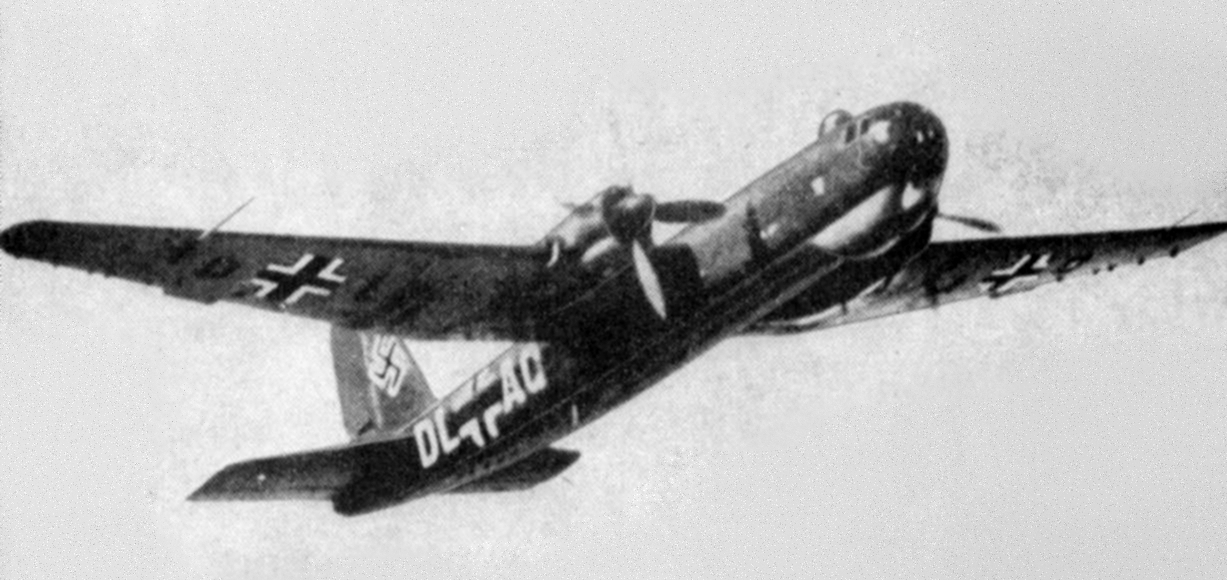
The only operational strategic bomber with the Luftwaffe in World War II was the troubled Heinkel He 177.

Following the untimely death of the top German advocate for strategic bombing, General Walther Wever in early June 1936, the focus of Nazi Germany's Luftwaffe bomber forces, the so-named Kampfgeschwader (bomber wings) became the battlefield support of the German Army as part of the general Blitzkrieg form of warfare, carried out with both medium bombers such as the Heinkel He 111, and Schnellbombers such as the Junkers Ju 88A. Support for the Ural bomber project before the start of WW II dwindled after Wever's death, with the only aircraft design that could closely match the Allied bomber force's aircraft – the Heinkel He 177A, originated in early November 1937, deployed in its initial form in 1941–42, hampered by a RLM requirement for it to also perform medium-angle dive bombing, not rescinded until September 1942 – unable to perform either function properly, with a powerplant selection and particular powerplant installation design features on the 30-meter wingspan Greif, that led to constant problems with engine fires. The trans-Atlantic ranged Amerika Bomber program started in March 1942 sought to ameliorate the lack of a long-range bomber for the Luftwaffe, but led only to three Messerschmitt- and two Junkers-built prototypes ever flying, and no operational "heavy bombers" for strategic use for the Third Reich beyond the roughly one thousand He 177s built.

By the end of the Second World War in 1945, the "heavy" bomber, epitomized by the British Avro Lancaster and American Boeing B-29 Superfortress used in the Pacific Theater, showed what could be accomplished by area bombing of Japan's cities and the often small and dispersed factories within them. Under Major General Curtis LeMay, the U.S. 20th Air Force, based in the Mariana Islands, undertook low-level incendiary bombing missions, results of which were soon measured in the number of square miles destroyed. The air raids on Japan had withered the nation's ability to continue fighting, although the Japanese government delayed surrender until atomic bombs were dropped on Hiroshima and Nagasaki in August 1945.

=== The Cold War and its aftermath ===
During the Cold War, the United States and United Kingdom on one side and the Soviet Union on the other kept strategic bombers ready to take off on short notice as part of the deterrent strategy of mutually assured destruction (MAD). Most strategic bombers of the two superpowers were designed to deliver nuclear weapons. For a time, some squadrons of Boeing B-52 Stratofortress bombers were kept in the air around the clock, orbiting some distance away from their fail-safe points near the Soviet border.

The British produced three different "V bombers" for the Royal Air Force which were designed and designated to be able to deliver British-made nuclear bombs to targets in European Russia. These bombers would have been able to reach and destroy cities such as Kiev or Moscow before American strategic bombers. While they were never used against the Soviet Union or its allies, two V bomber types, the Avro Vulcan and the Handley Page Victor, were used in the Falklands War towards the end of their operational lives.

The Soviet Union produced hundreds of unlicensed copies of the American Boeing B-29 Superfortress, which the Soviet Air Forces called the Tupolev Tu-4. The Soviets later developed the jet-powered Tupolev Tu-16 "Badger".

The People's Republic of China produced a version of Tupolev Tu-16 on license from the Soviet Union in the 1960s, which they named the Xian H-6.

During the 1960s France produced its Dassault Mirage IV nuclear-armed bomber for the French Air Force as a part of its independent nuclear strike force, the Force de Frappe, using French-made bombers and IRBMs to deliver French-made nuclear weapons. Mirage IVs served until mid-1996 in the bomber role, and to 2005 as reconnaissance aircraft.

The French Republic limited its strategic armaments to a squadron of four nuclear-powered ballistic missile submarines, with 16 SLBM tubes apiece. France also maintains an active force of supersonic fighter-bombers carrying ASMP stand-off nuclear missiles, with Mach 3 speed and a range of 500 kilometers. These missiles can be delivered by the Dassault Mirage 2000N and Rafale fighter-bombers; the Rafale is also capable of refueling others in flight using a buddy refueling pod.

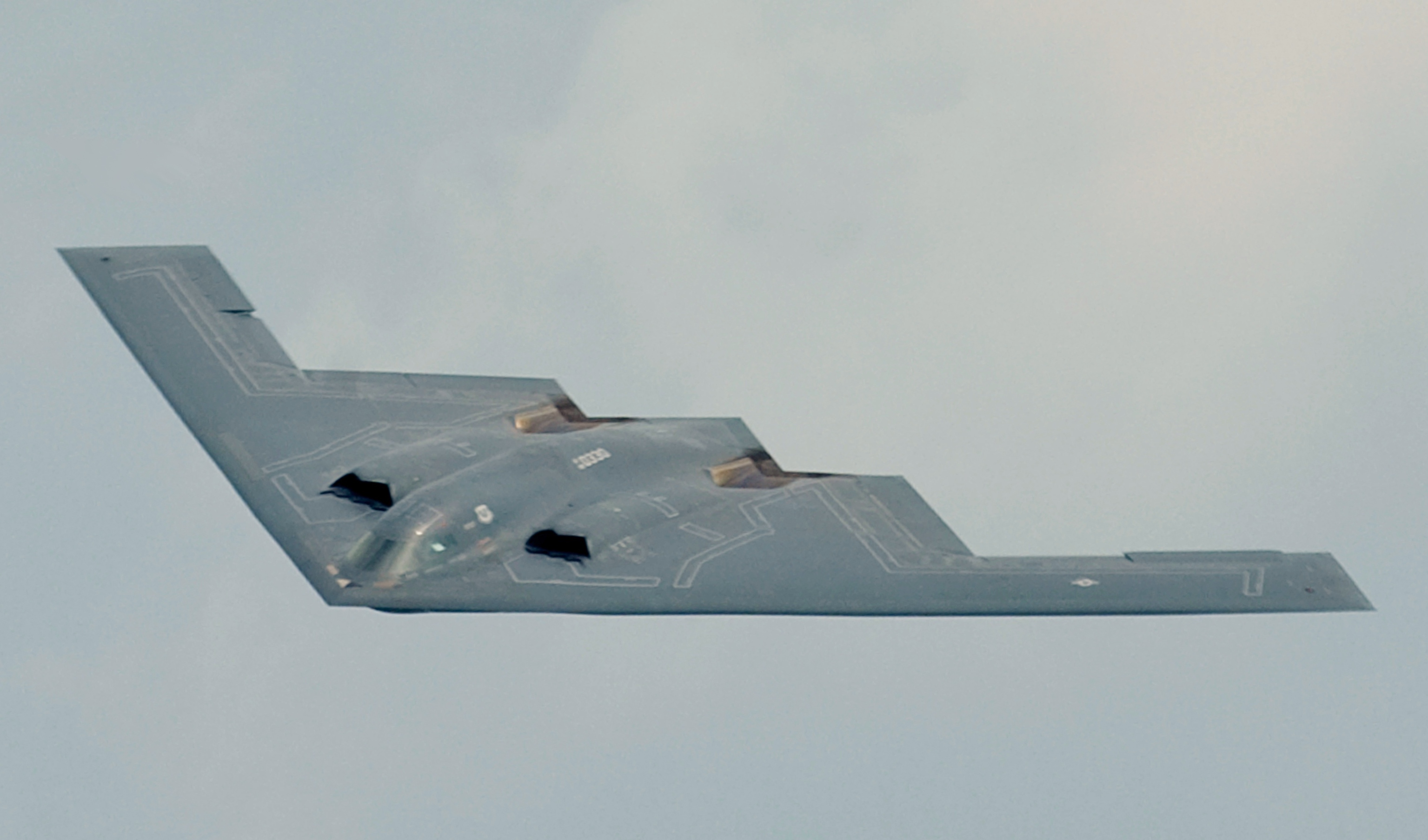
A USAF B-2 Spirit stealth bomber.

Newer strategic bombers such as the Rockwell B-1 Lancer, the Tupolev Tu-160, and the Northrop Grumman B-2 Spirit designs incorporate various levels of stealth technology in an effort to avoid detection, especially by radar networks. Despite these advances earlier strategic bombers, for example the B-52 last manufactured in 1962 and the Tupolev Tu-95, remain in service and can also deploy the latest air-launched cruise missiles and other "stand-off" or precision guided weapons such as the JASSM and the JDAM.

The Russian Air Force's new Tu-160M2 strategic bombers are expected to be delivered on a regular basis over the course of 10 to 20 years. The Tu-95 and Tu-160 bombers will be periodically updated, as was done during the 1990s with the Tu-22M bombers.

Strategic bombers of the Cold War were primarily armed with nuclear weapons. During the post-1940s Indochina Wars, and also since the end of the Cold War, modern bombers originally intended for strategic use have been exclusively employed using non-nuclear, high explosive weapons. During the Vietnam War, Operation Menu, Operation Freedom Deal, Gulf War, military action in Afghanistan, and the 2003 invasion of Iraq, American B-52s and B-1s were mostly employed in tactical roles. During the Soviet-Afghan war in 1979–88, Soviet Air Forces Tu-22Ms carried out several mass air raids in various regions of Afghanistan.

As of 2025, the United States Air Force is the largest operator with 130 strategic bombers in active service, between the B-52 Stratofortress, B-1 Lancer, and Northrop B-2 Spirit. The Russian Air Force is second with 119 bombers between its Tu-95, Tu-22M, and Tu-160.

== Notable strategic bombers ==
=== Nomenclature ===
Bombers listed below were used in the main or represented a shift in long-range bomber design (Maximum bomb load). In practice, bomb loads carried are dependent on factors such as the distance to target and the individual type, size or weight of bombs used.

Nomenclature for size classification of aircraft types used in strategic bombing varies, particularly since the time of World War II due to sequential technological advancements and changes in aerial warfare strategy and tactics. The B-29, for example was a benchmark aircraft of the heavy bomber type at end of World War II due to its size, range and load carrying ability; as the Cold War began, it became an intercontinental range strategic bomber with the development of new techniques, such as aerial refueling (which also greatly extended the range of other medium- to long-range bombers, fighter-bombers and attack aircraft).

During the 1950s the U.S. Strategic Air Command also briefly brought back the outdated term "medium bomber" to distinguish its Boeing B-47 Stratojets from somewhat larger contemporary Boeing B-52 Stratofortress "heavy bombers" in bombardment wings; older B-29 and B-50 heavy bombers were also redesignated as "medium" during this period. SAC's nomenclature here was purely semantic and bureaucratic, however as both the B-47 and B-52 strategic bombers were much larger and had far greater performance and load-carrying ability than any of the World War II-era heavy or medium bombers.

Other aircraft such as the twin-jet US FB-111, Douglas A-3 Skywarrior and France's Dassault Mirage IV had nominal warloads of less than 20,000 lb (9,100 kg), and were significantly smaller in size and gross weight compared with their strategic bomber contemporaries, based on which they might be classified as medium bombers. In the nuclear strike role, France would replace its Mirage IVs beginning in the late 1980s with the even smaller, single-engine Mirage 2000N fighter-bomber, a further example of advancing technologies and changing tactics in military aviation and aircraft design. France's newer twin-engine Dassault Rafale multirole fighter also has nuclear strike capability.

=== World War I ===
- Caproni Ca.1
- Caproni Ca.3 (1,700 lb (770 kg))
- Gotha G.IV (1,100 lb (500 kg))
- Zeppelin Staaken R.VI (4,400 lb (2,000 kg))
- Zeppelin (about 5,000 lb (2,300 kg))
- Handley Page Type O (2,000 lb (910 kg))
- Handley Page V/1500 (7,500 lb (3,400 kg))
- Sikorsky Ilya Muromets (1,100 lb (500 kg))

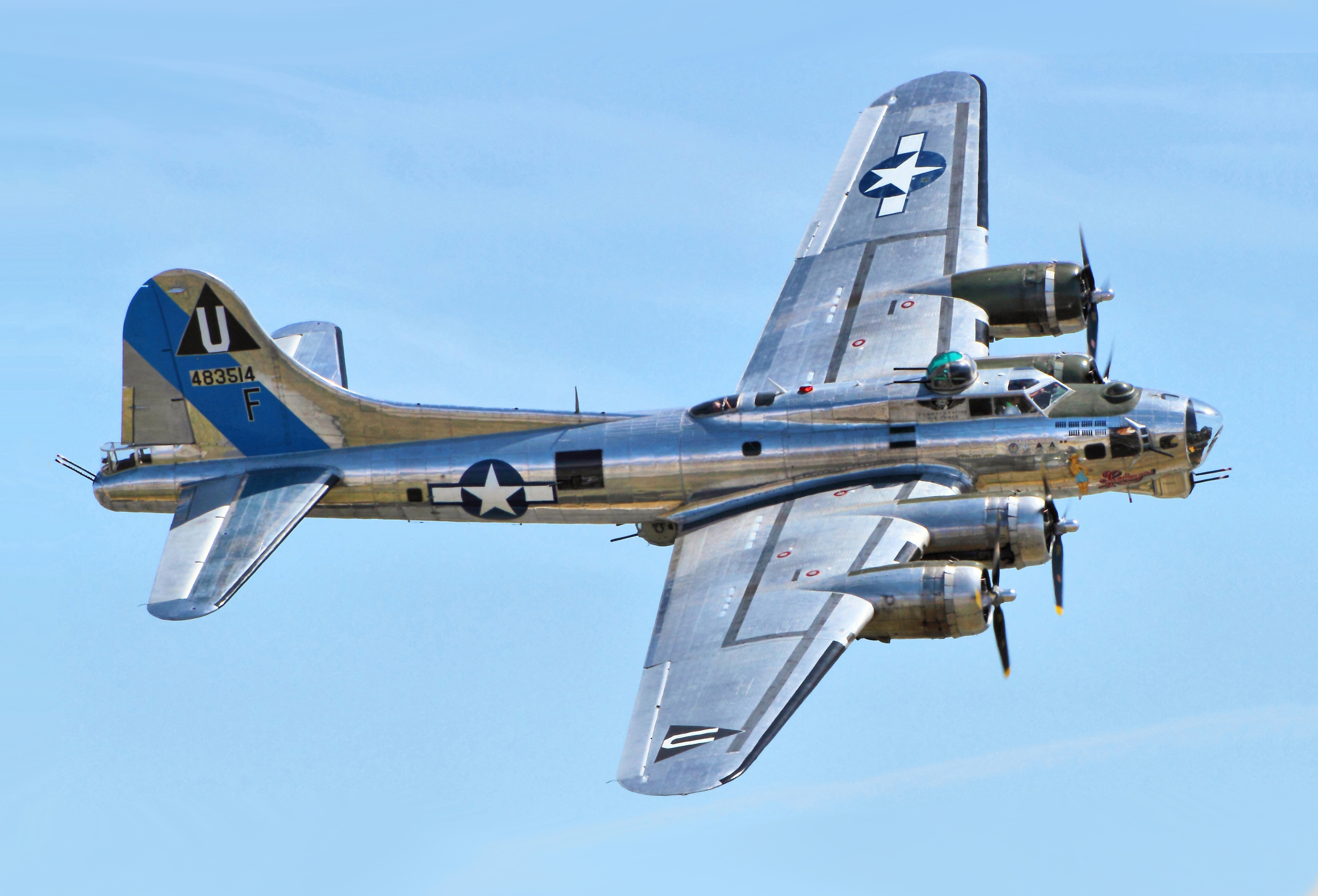
The Boeing B-17 Flying Fortress

=== Interwar/World War II ===
- Boeing YB-9 (prototype strategic bomber, inspiration for the B-17)
- Martin B-10 (successors B-17 and B-24 therefore and theoretically the first strategic bomber of the USAAF at that time despite being a medium bomber.)
- Boeing B-17 Flying Fortress (8,000 lb (3,600 kg)) (theoretical maximum: 17,410 lb (7,900 kg))
- Consolidated B-24 Liberator (8,000 lb (3,600 kg))
- Boeing B-29 Superfortress (20,000 lb (9,100 kg)) (maximum of 44,000 lb (20,000 kg) (2 22,000 lb (10,000 kg) Grand Slams))
- Consolidated B-32 Dominator (20,000 lb (9,100 kg))
- Handley Page Halifax (13,000 lb (5,900 kg))
- Avro Lancaster (22,000 lb (10,000 kg))
- Short Stirling (18,000 lb (8,200 kg))
- Farman F.220 (9,240 lb (4,190 kg))
- Heinkel He 177 (15,870 lb (7,200 kg))
- Petlyakov Pe-8 (11,000 lb (5,000 kg))
- Piaggio P.108 (7,700 lb (3,500 kg))

=== Cold War ===
Weapons loads can include nuclear-armed missiles as well as aerial bombs

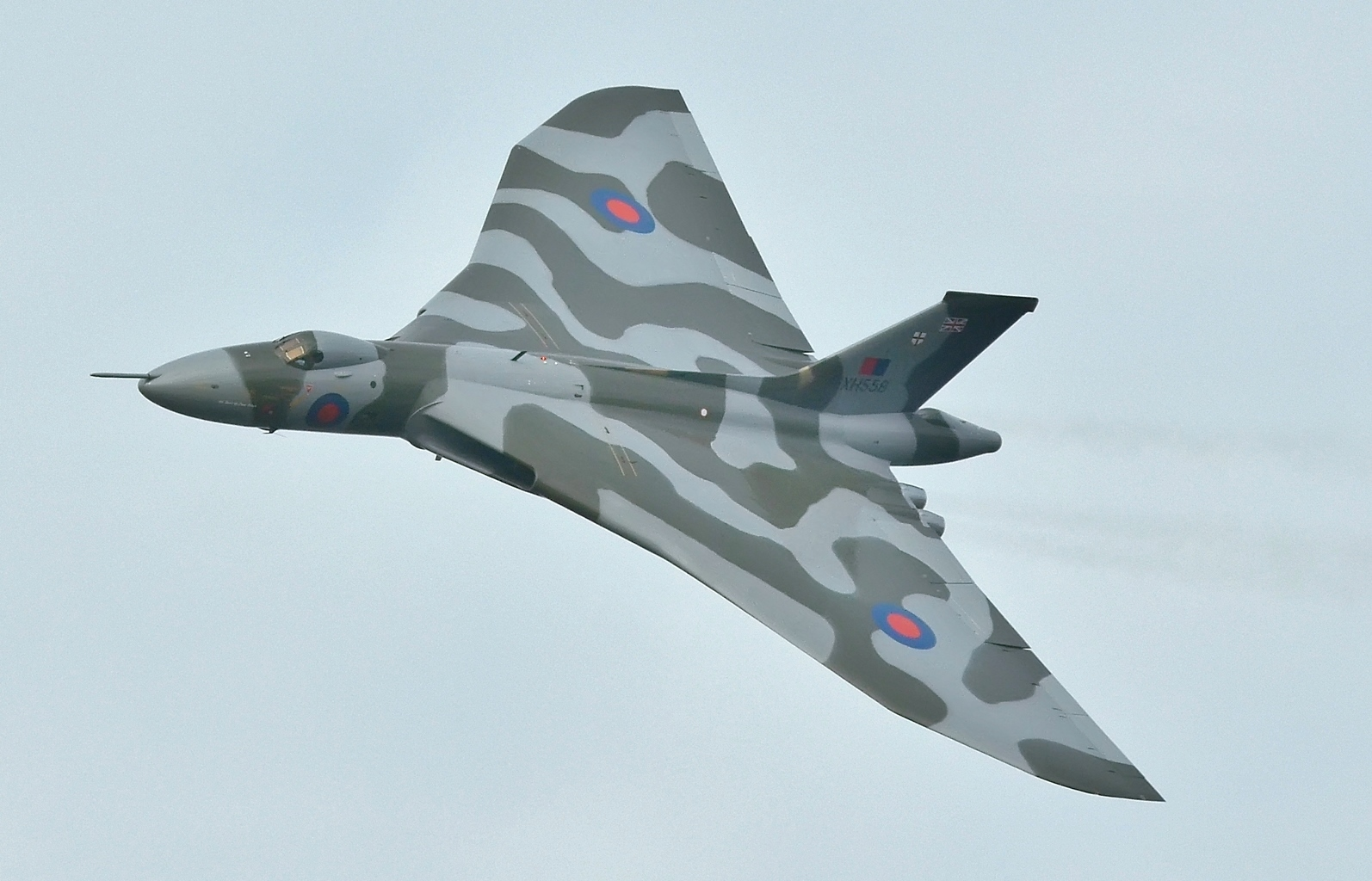
RAF Avro Vulcan

- Reciprocating/Turbine engine
  - North American AJ Savage (12,000 lb (5,400 kg))
  - Lockheed P-2 Neptune – small number converted as carrier-launched nuclear-armed bombers which would have to ditch/recover at land bases
  - Boeing B-50 Superfortress (28,000 lb (13,000 kg))
  - Convair B-36 Peacemaker (72,000 lb (33,000 kg))
  - Tupolev Tu-4 – reverse-engineered version of B-29 Superfortress
  - Tupolev Tu-95 (55,000 lb (25,000 kg))
  - Avro Lincoln (22,000 lb (10,000 kg))
- Jet engine
  - North American B-45 Tornado (22,000 lb (10,000 kg))
  - Boeing B-47 Stratojet (25,000 lb (11,000 kg))
  - Douglas A-3 Skywarrior – nuclear-armed, carrier-based
  - Boeing B-52 Stratofortress (70,000 lb (32,000 kg))
  - Myasishchev M-4 (52,910 lb (24,000 kg))
  - Tupolev Tu-16 (20,000 lb (9,100 kg))
  - Vickers Valiant (21,000 lb (9,500 kg))
  - Avro Vulcan (21,000 lb (9,500 kg))
  - Handley Page Victor (35,000 lb (16,000 kg))
  - Xian H-6 (26,400 lb (12,000 kg))
- Supersonic
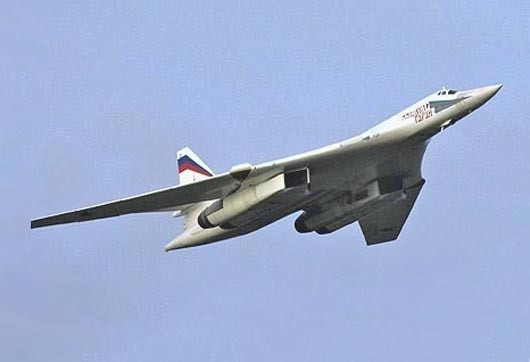
  Russian Air Force Tupolev Tu-160
  - Convair B-58 Hustler (19,450 lb (8,820 kg))
  - General Dynamics FB-111A – strategic bomber version of the F-111 swing wing strike aircraft
  - North American A-5 Vigilante – nuclear-armed, carrier-based (only deployed for a brief period in strategic nuclear strike role for which it was originally designed before transitioning to reconnaissance role)
  - Rockwell B-1 Lancer (75,000 lb (34,000 kg) – use of external hardpoints restricted by START I)
  - Dassault Mirage IV (16,000 lb (7,300 kg))
  - Tupolev Tu-22M Backfire (46,300 lb (21,000 kg))
  - Tupolev Tu-160 Blackjack (88,200 lb (40,000 kg))
  - Tupolev Tu-22 Blinder (20,000 lb (9,100 kg))
  - Dassault Mirage 2000N
  - Others designed and built which did not enter operational service:
    - North American XB-70 Valkyrie
    - Myasishchev M-50 Bounder
    - Sukhoi T-4 Sotka
    - BAC TSR-2

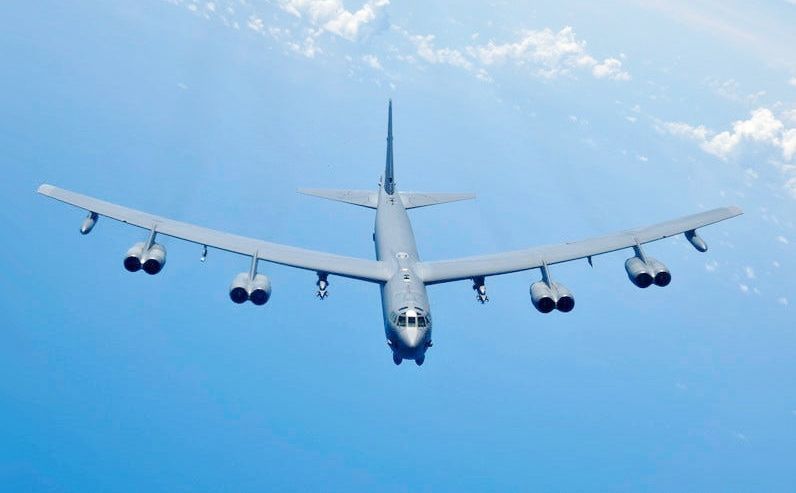
A USAF Boeing B-52 Stratofortress

=== Post Cold War ===
- Boeing B-52 Stratofortress (70,000 lb (32,000 kg))
- Northrop Grumman B-2 Spirit (40,000 lb (18,000 kg))
- Rockwell B-1 Lancer (75,000 lb (34,000 kg))
- Tupolev Tu-22M (46,300 lb (21,000 kg))
- Tupolev Tu-95 (55,000 lb (25,000 kg))
- Tupolev Tu-160 (88,200 lb (40,000 kg))
- Xian H-6 (26,400 lb (12,000 kg))

=== Future ===
- Xian H-20. An under-development stealth bomber by China. Planned to be deployed in 2025.
- Northrop Grumman B-21 Raider. An under-development stealth bomber by the United States, with a goal of supplanting the current Rockwell B-1 Lancer and Northrop Grumman B-2 Spirit.
- Tupolev PAK DA. An under-development stealth bomber by Russia, with a goal of supplanting a portion or all of the current Tupolev Tu-95. Planned to be deployed in 2027.

== See also ==
- Carpet bombing
- High level bombing
- Long Range Strike Bomber program
- Next-Generation Bomber
