= AN-22 bomb =

AN-22
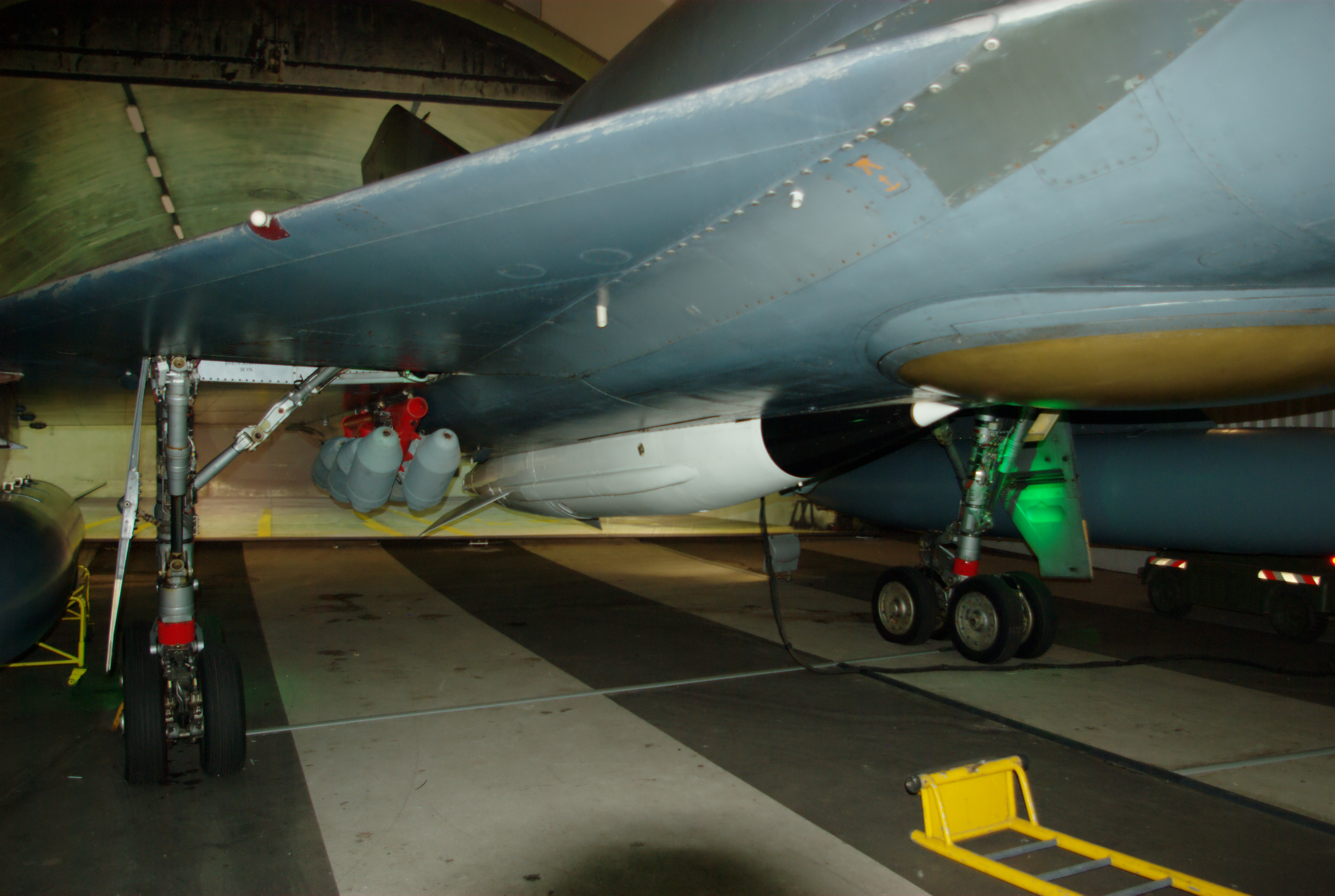
- Dassault Mirage IV A with AN-22.
- Type: Nuclear bomb
- Place of origin: France

Service history
- In service: 1967-1988

Production history
- No. built: 40

Specifications
- Mass: 700 kg
- Blast yield: 70 kilotons

The AN-22 was France's second air-dropped nuclear weapon, developed as a replacement for the earlier AN-11 bomb, entering service in 1967. It had a similar 60 to 70 kilotons yield fission warhead to the earlier AN-11, but with enhanced safety features and a parachute retarder to enable it to be dropped at low level. Additionally the casing was redesigned reducing its weight from approximately 1,400 kg (3,000 lb) to around 700 kg (1,500 lb). One bomb could be mounted in the bomb layer of the fuselage of Mirage IVA, which was mainly produced in the early stages.

A stockpile of about 40 weapons was maintained, providing one for each of the 36 Mirage IVAs in service, plus several spares. The last warhead was retired on 1 July 1988, at which point the ASMP standoff missile took over the role previously held by the AN-22.

== See also ==
- Force de frappe
