= Roland Glavany =

French army general

- Born: 20 April 1922
- Died: 16 January 2017 (aged 95)
- Military career
- Branch: French Air Force
- Unit: Free French Air Forces
- Conflicts: World War II

Roland Glavany (20 April 1922 – 16 January 2017) was a French army general.

== Background ==
Glavany trained as a pilot in World War II and fought in North Africa with the Free French forces. In September 1943, he landed on Corsica as part of a parachute troop, and took part in the liberation of the island. He was wounded three times in the war.

After the end of the war, he worked as a test pilot for Dassault, making the first flights of the MD.550 Mystère Delta, Mirage III and Mirage IV. He returned to the French Air Force in 1959. He retired in 1978.
