= AN-11 bomb =

AN-11
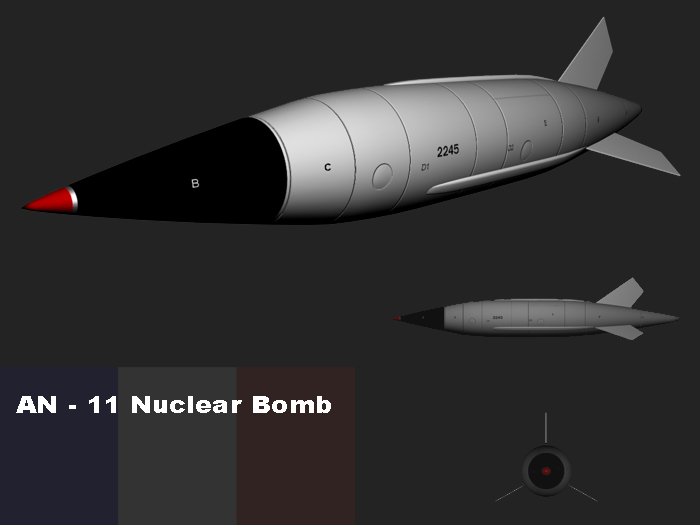
- AN-11
- Type: Bomb
- Place of origin: France

Service history
- In service: 1964-1967

Specifications
- Mass: 3,306 lb (1,500 kg)
- Blast yield: 60 kilotons

The AN-11 was France's first nuclear weapon, developed to arm the Force de frappe.

The AN-11's development began in the late 1950s. An early version was used in France's first nuclear test, Gerboise Bleue, on 13 February 1960. The first AN-11 prototype was tested 1 May 1962, and it entered service in 1964.

The AN-11 was a pure fission weapon, a plutonium implosion type. It weighed approximately 1,500 kg (3,306 lb). It was a free-fall bomb intended to be dropped from high-altitude bombers. The explosive nuclear weapon yield was about 60 kt.

About 40 AN-11s were produced between 1963 and 1968. The carrier was the Dassault Mirage IV, although some reports said the Sud Aviation Vautour could also carry this bomb. Beginning in 1967 it was replaced by the more advanced AN-22 bomb.
