= TNA (Airborne nuclear warhead) =

French thermonuclear bomb warhead

The French Tête nucléaire aéroportée (TNA) or Airborne nuclear warhead is a thermonuclear warhead carried by the Air-sol moyenne portée amélioré (ASMP-A) medium-range air-to-surface missile, a component of the Force de dissuasion French nuclear deterrent. The warhead was introduced in 2010. 54 warheads had been produced replacing former TN 81 warhead carried by former Air-sol moyenne portée (ASMP) medium-range air-to-surface missile.

Deployment: 54 warheads carried by the ASMP-A equipping the Dassault Rafale B with the French Air Force and Dassault Rafale M of Naval Aviation. The airborne nuclear warheads (TNA) that are carried on the new improved medium-range air-to-ground missiles (in French ASMP-A) are now loaded underneath the Rafale aircraft. Each TNA has a yield of 300 kilotonnes.

Specifications:

- Thermonuclear weapon
- Yield from 100 to 300 kiloton
- Insensitive explosives
