= TN 81 =

French thermonuclear warhead

The French airborne nuclear warheads (TN81) is a thermonuclear warhead carried by the Air-Sol Moyenne Portée (ASMP) medium-range air-to-surface missile, a component of the Force de frappe French nuclear deterrent. The warhead was introduced in 1988. By 1991, 80 warheads had been produced.

Deployment: 60 warheads carried by the ASMP equipping the 60 Mirage 2000 N with the French Air Force and 20 Super Etendard of Naval Aviation. The TN81 has a yield of 300 kilotons

It has been replaced by 54 TNA (Airborne nuclear warhead) thermonuclear warhead carried by the ASMPA equipping the Mirage 2000 N and Dassault Rafale.

Specifications:

- thermonuclear weapon
- yield from 100 to 300 kiloton
- insensitive explosives
