= Air-sol moyenne portée =

1986 French nuclear cruise missile

- Dassault Rafale carrying an ASMP missile
- Type: Medium-range supersonic stand-off nuclear missile
- Place of origin: France

Service history
- In service: May 1986–present

Production history
- Designer: Aérospatiale
- Manufacturer: Aérospatiale (until 2001); MBDA France (2001–present)

Specifications
- Mass: 860 kg (1,900 lb)
- Length: 5.38 m (17.7 ft)
- Diameter: 380 mm (15 in)
- Warhead: TN 81 nuclear warhead, variable yield 100 to 300 kilotons of TNT (420 to 1,260 TJ)
- Engine: liquid-fuel ramjet
- Operational range: ASMP: 300 km (190 mi) (estimated; the ASMP's range as well as that of its modernized variants are classified information); ASMP-A: 500 km (310 mi); ASMPA-R: 500 km (310 mi)–600 km (370 mi)
- Maximum speed: up to Mach 3
- Launch platform: Dassault Rafale; Dassault Mirage IV (retired); Dassault Mirage 2000N (retired); Dassault Super Étendard (retired)

The Air-sol moyenne portée (ASMP; lit. 'Medium-Range Air-to-Surface') is a French nuclear-armed air-launched cruise missile manufactured by MBDA France. In French nuclear doctrine, it serves what is referred to as a "pre-strategic" deterrence role. It is intended to be the ultimate "warning shot" prior to the full-scale employment of the strategic nuclear weapons arming the Triomphant-class ballistic missile submarines. The missile's development was undertaken by Aérospatiale's missile systems division, whose assets are now part of MBDA.

The ASMP entered service in May 1986. The development of an upgraded version, the ASMP-A, was launched in 1997 and service entry occurred in 2009. In 2016, yet another modernization program, the ASMPA-R, was launched. The first firing test of the ASMPA-R took place in December 2021 and the second in March 2022.

The ASN4G air-launched hypersonic cruise missile, under development as of 2014, is expected to succeed the ASMP from 2035 onwards.

== Development ==
=== ASMP ===
The ASMP entered service in May 1986, replacing the earlier free-fall AN-22 bomb on France's Dassault Mirage IV aircraft and the AN-52 bomb on Dassault Super Étendard. About 84 weapons are stockpiled. Carrier aircraft are the Dassault Mirage 2000N, Dassault Rafale and Super Étendard. The Mirage IVP carried the ASMP until retired in 1996.

ASMP and ASMP-A are 5.38 metres (17.7 ft) long and weigh 860 kilograms (1,900 lb). It is a supersonic standoff missile powered by a liquid fuel ramjet. It flies at Mach 2 to Mach 3, with a range between 80 and 300 kilometres (50 and 190 mi) for the ASMP and 500 kilometres (310 mi) for the ASMP-A depending on flight profile. The ASMP uses the TN 81 warhead, which has a variable-yield of 100 to 300 kilotons of TNT (420 to 1,260 TJ).

In 1991, 90 missiles and 80 warheads were reported to have been produced. By 2001, 60 of them were reported as operational.

=== ASLP Air-Sol Longue Portée ===
An extended range version of the ASMP (up to 1200 km) was developed by Aerospatiale in the 1990s. It featured a rear delta wing planform blended forward into the flat undersurface body, one dorsal air intake. Aerospatiale also proposed it a joint Franco-British project for the United Kingdom's SR(A) 1244 requirement, a nuclear-armed standoff missile also known as Tactical Air-to-Surface Missile (TASM). Development did not proceed beyond a mockup of the missile.

=== ASMP-A ===
An upgraded version known as Air-Sol Moyenne Portée-Amélioré (ASMP-A) for (improved ASMP) has a range of about 500 kilometres (310 mi) at a speed of up to Mach 3 with the new Tête Nucléaire Aéroportée (TNA) 300 kt thermonuclear warhead. It entered service in October 2009 with the Mirage 2000NK3 of squadron EC 3/4 at Istres and in July 2010 with the Rafales of squadron EC 1/91 at Saint Dizier. 54 ASMP-A have been delivered to French Air and Space Force.

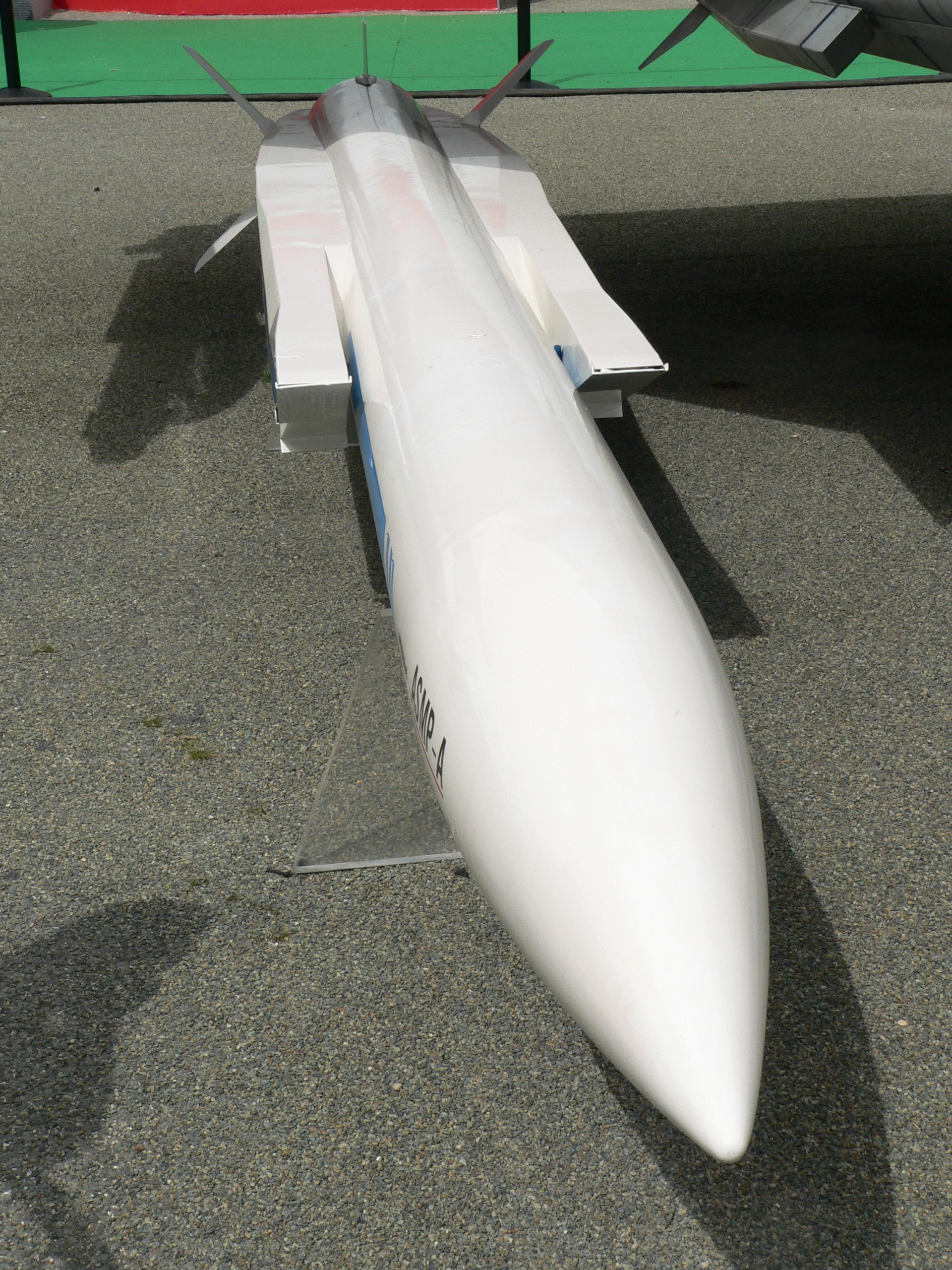
ASMP-A

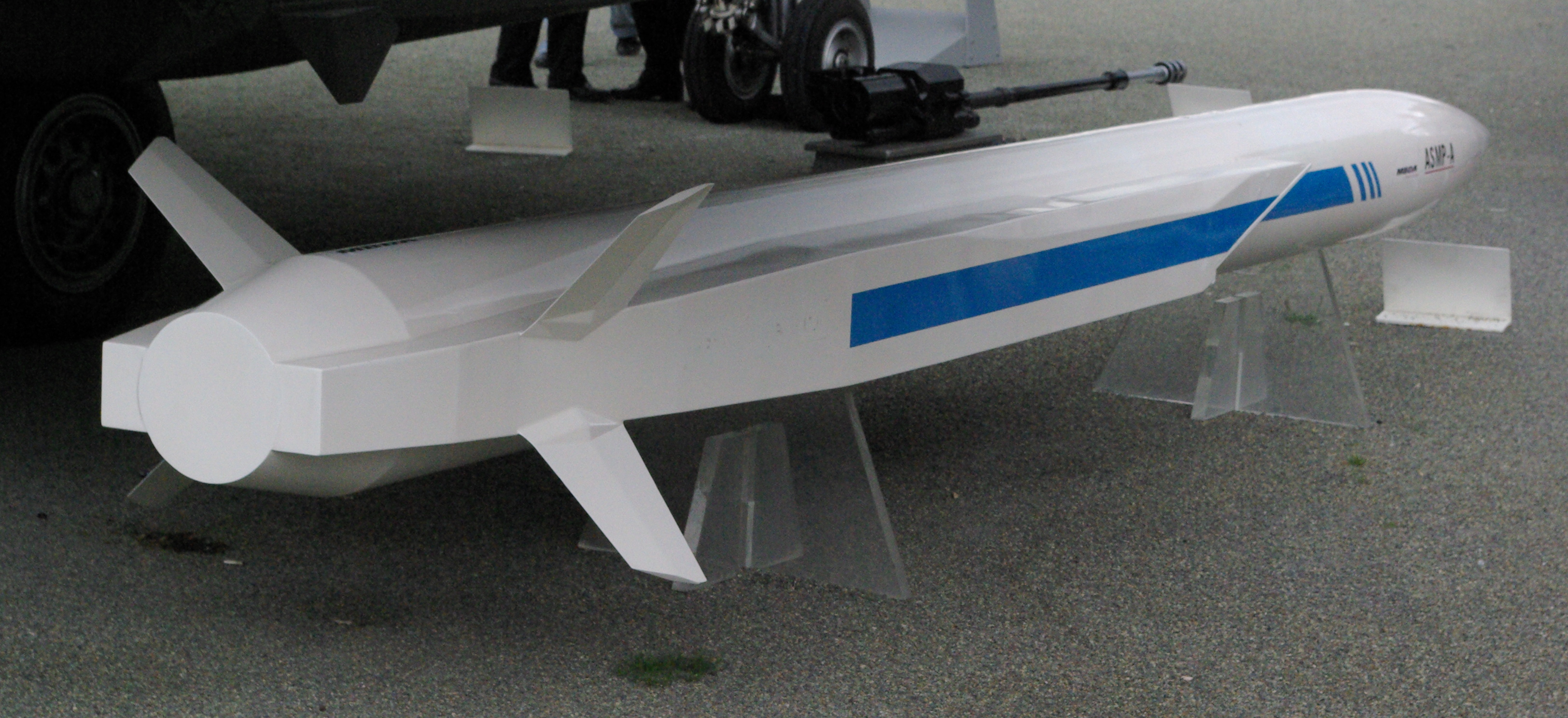
Back of ASMP-A mock-up

=== ASMPA-R ===
The ASMPA-R (renovated) project, launched in 2016, will see some components replaced by newer ones (hence "renewed"), the missile's range extended and a new 300kt thermonuclear warhead added. It also has a slightly different rear fin arrangement. First flight test occurred in December 2021 and the second in March 2022. After entering operational service, it was first fired by the French Air and Space Force as part of the French nuclear exercise "Operation Durandal" in May 2024. According to the French government it entered service with the Force Aeronavale Nucleaire 10 November 2025.

== Successor ==
Studies for the successor to the ASMP missile, currently known as ASN4G (Air-Sol Nucléaire de 4ème Génération), a scramjet-powered hypersonic cruise missile, were confirmed to have already begun in 2014. The ASN4G will be carried by the Rafale F5 fighter and its successor; the requirement is for a missile range much greater than 1,000 kilometres (600 mi). The ASN4G is being developed by MBDA France in cooperation with the ONERA.

== Operators ==
France

- French Air and Space Force
- French Navy
