= 2nd Naval Air Fighter Attack Squadron =

Second naval fighters strike squadron
- Founded: 1956; 70 years ago
- Country: Argentina
- Branch: Argentine Naval Aviation
- Role: Embarked fighters
- Garrison/HQ: Comandante Espora, Bahía Blanca
- Battle honours: Falklands (Malvinas)
- Website: argentina.gob.ar/aviacionnaval

Commanders
- Notable commanders: Jorge Colombo

The 2da Escuadrilla Aeronaval de Caza y Ataque (EA32) (Second Naval Fighter/Strike squadron) is the main strike unit of the Argentine Naval Aviation, the air branch of the Argentine Navy.

== Badge ==
The insignia is nicknamed La Lora (female parrot) and was created in 1956 and inspired by US Navy fighter squadron VF-884/VF-144 Bitter Birds's Jayhawk, a mythological hawk from the Kansas state, but painted green instead of blue.

== History ==
In 1944 the two naval aviation Reconnaissance units were converted to Attack Squadrons, receiving their Vought V-65F & V-142A; in 1945 the 2nd was converted into a Bomber Squadron. The 2nd squadron was re-established in 1949 as a Combat Squadron flying AT-6 Texan, and finally received its current name in August 1956 on receiving Vought F4U-5 Corsairs for use on the ARA Independencia aircraft carrier.

United States President Jimmy Carter imposed an arms embargo, including spare parts and personnel training, on the military government of Argentina in 1977 in response to human rights abuses; Argentina turned mainly to France for military supplies since the Kennedy Amendment imposed a US. embargo over Argentina. In 1980 the Naval Aviation, unable to source spare parts for their US A-4Q Skyhawks, ordered 14 Super Etendards from France. Argentine pilots used French flight trainers between November 1980 and August 1981 in France including operations from the aircraft carrier Clemenceau but, although all A-4Q veterans, they had received only 45 hours of flight time in the new aircraft when in April 1982 the Falklands War (Spanish: Guerra de Malvinas) began.

=== Falklands War ===
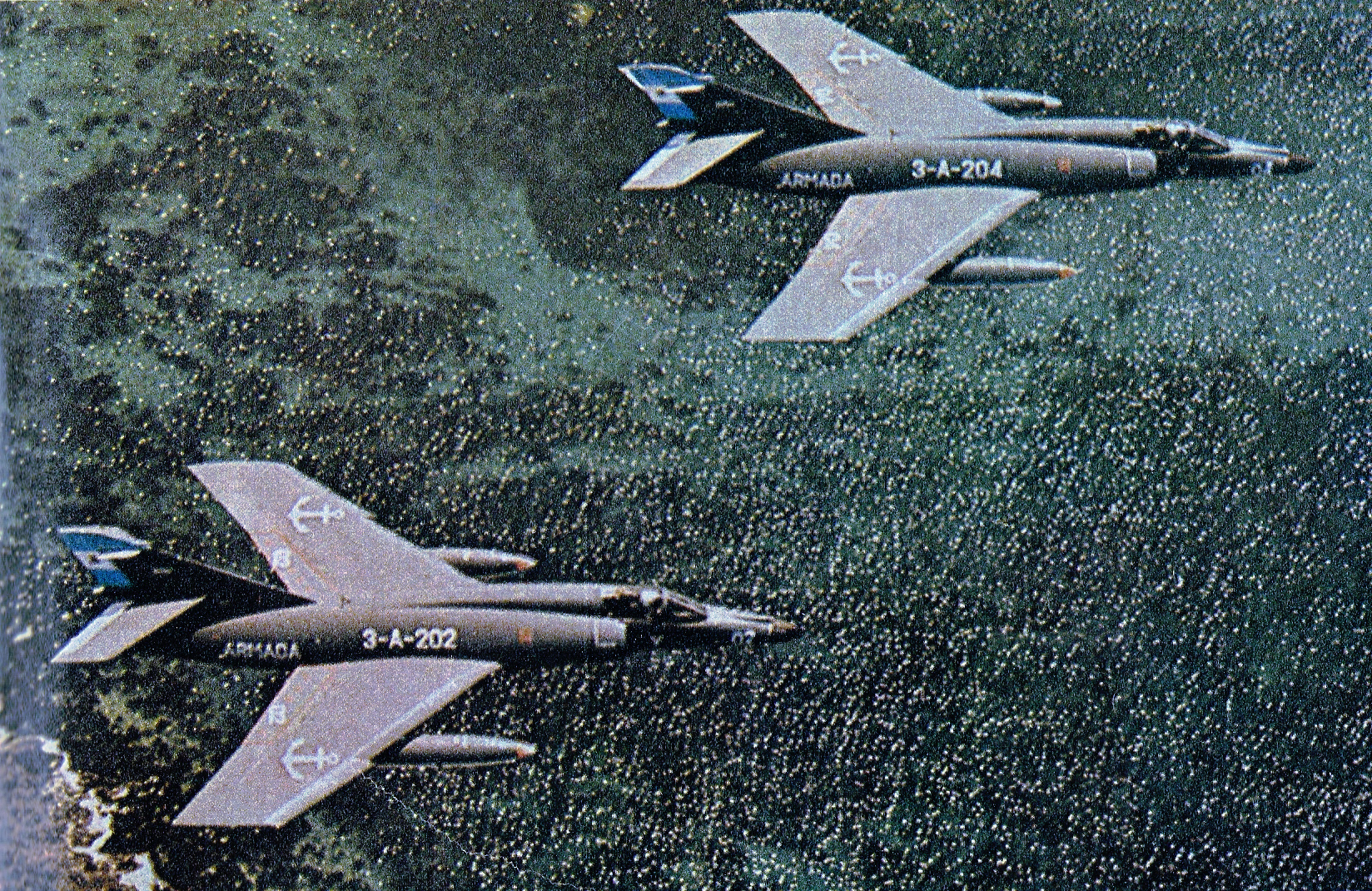
A pair of Super Etendards in 1982; the squadron's five aircraft were used to carry the AM39 Exocet missile against the British Task Force

Five Super Étendards, or Sue (Spanish pronunciation: [ˈsu.e]) as they are called, and five Exocet missiles had already been shipped to Argentina in November 1981, when an arms embargo by the European Economic Community—of which France was a member—imposed in response to the 1982 invasion of the Falkland Islands by Argentina halted deliveries. More problematically, the French technicians working at Bahía Blanca on the integration of the Exocet into the Super Etendard received orders to leave the country. Nevertheless, the Squadron managed to complete the work. Additionally, Britain took actions that prevented Argentina from acquiring more Exocets.

The carrier ARA 25 de Mayo had not yet having been modified to allow the aircraft to operate on board, so they were deployed south to the naval air base at Rio Grande, Tierra del Fuego. One aircraft—SUE serial number 3-A-201—was dismantled to be cannibalized for spare parts. while the others used aerial refuelling from KC-130 Hercules tankers of the Argentine Air Force to perform the following missions (showing aircraft used):

May 2 Cpt Colombo and Lt Machetanz
May 4 Cpt Bedacarratz and Lt Mayora (3-A-202 & 3-A-203) sank destroyer HMS Sheffield. Two Exocets fired.
May 15 The retirement of the last of the maritime patrol SP-2H Neptunes due to airframe attrition affected the Squadron reconnaissance support.
May 23 Cpt Agotegaray and Lt Mariani did not find targets at the designated location.
May 25 Cpt Curilovic and Lt Barraza (3-A-203 & 3-A-204) sank MV Atlantic Conveyor, carrying helicopters and supplies. Two Exocets fired.
May 30 Cpt Francisco and Lt Collavino (3-A-202 & 3-A-205) were joined by four Air Force A-4C Skyhawks of Grupo IV for an attack on carrier HMS Invincible. Two of the Skyhawks were shot down by Sea Dart missiles from HMS Exeter during their final approach, and while they were following the wake of the last AM 39 Exocet missile available, fired by one of the two SUEs (Collavino).

=== Present ===
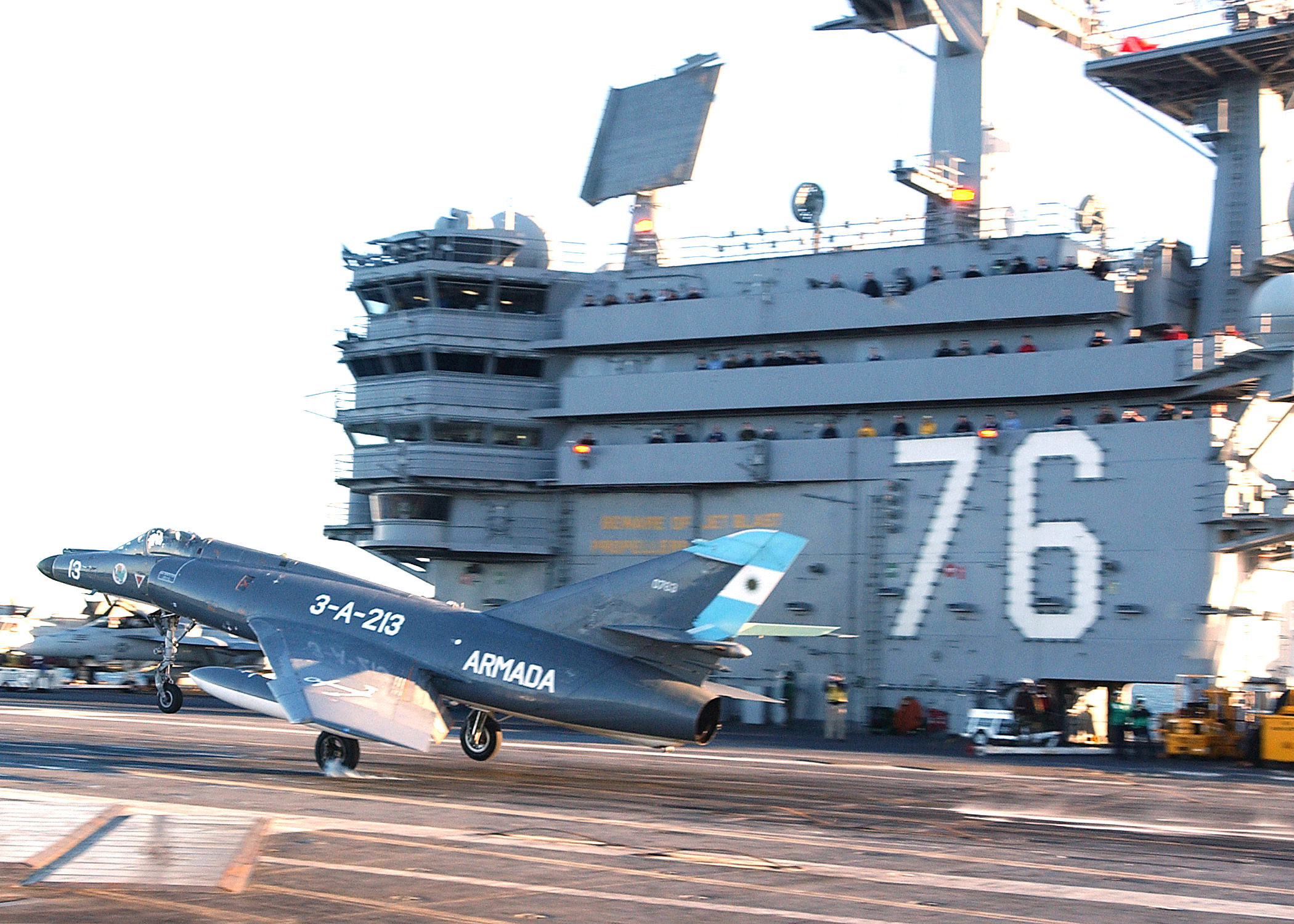
USS Ronald Reagan on 2004

Once the conflict was over, the rest of the Super Etendards shipment was delivered and the squadron performed qualifications on aircraft carrier ARA 25 de Mayo ^{Video}. After the retirement of their last carrier, Argentina cooperated with the Brazilian Navy, allowing the naval air wing to continue to operate from the deck of Brazilian carrier NAe São Paulo during ARAEX exercises ^{video}, and to carry out touch-and-go landings on US Navy carriers when they are in transit within Argentine coastal waters during Gringo-Gaucho manoeuvres ^{video} Super Etendard 3-A-203 was lost in a fatal crash on 29 May 1996 while attempting to land on Punta Indio airstrip.

In March 2010, during USS Carl Vinson's tour around South America, the squadron performed Gringo-Gaucho / Southern Seas 2010 manoeuvres with the US aircraft carrier.

As of 2010, the Squadron was still using Super Étendards, and French cooperation to upgrade the aircraft was announced. Five refurbished Super Etendard aircraft were delivered to the Navy in 2019. However, as of 2022 these aircraft await the delivery of key spare parts and may not be in operational service for a further years.

== See also ==
- Flottille 17F
