= Peter Harrison =

Peter or Pete Harrison may refer to:

- Peter Harrison (architect) (1716–1775), British-born colonial American architect
- P. S. Harrison (1880–1966), also known as Pete Harrison, founder and publisher of Harrison's Reports
- Pete Harrison (1885–1921), English-American baseball umpire
- Peter Harrison (city planner) (1918–1990), Canberra city planner
- Peter Harrison (footballer, born 1927) (1927-2006), English footballer, see List of AFC Bournemouth players
- Peter Harrison (rugby union) (1934–2011), Bradford RFC player
- Sir Peter Harrison (philanthropist) (1937–2021), British businessman and philanthropist
- Peter Harrison (priest) (born 1939), archdeacon of the East Riding
- Peter G. Harrison (born 1951), professor of computing science at Imperial College London
- Peter Harrison (historian) (born 1955), professor at the University of Queensland
- Peter Harrison (businessman) (born 1966), British businessman, CEO of Schroders
- Peter Harrison (footballer) (fl. 1995–2012), English footballer, manager and football agent
- Peter L. Harrison, Australian marine biologist and ecologist
- Peter Harrison (Brookside), a character from the British television series Brookside

== See also ==
- Peter Harrison Planetarium, digital laser planetarium situated in Greenwich Park, London
- Peter Harryson (born 1948), Swedish actor
- Peter Harris (disambiguation)
