= Roberto Curilovic =

Argentinian Navy pilot (born 1947)

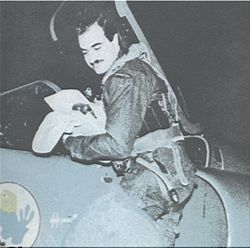
- Curilovic boarding his Super Etendard
- Born: Roberto Curilovic; January 3, 1947 (age 79); Buenos Aires, Argentina
- Allegiance: Argentina
- Branch: Argentine Navy
- Rank: Corvette Captain
- Conflicts: Falklands War; Sinking of the SS Atlantic Conveyor
- Awards: Medal of Valour in Combat
- Other work: Speaker

Captain Roberto Curilovic (born January 3, 1947) is a former Argentinian Navy pilot. On 25 May 1982 in the Falklands War, he sank the transport ship Atlantic Conveyor with an Exocet AM.39 anti-ship missile.

== Career ==
He finished his naval training at the Escuela Naval Militar (República Argentina) in 1969, flying the North American T-28 Trojan.

In September 1980, he went with eight pilots and around forty technicians of the 2da Escuadrilla Aeronaval de Caza y Ataque (2nd Air Naval Fighter and Strike Squadron) to the naval base at Rochefort, Charente-Maritime in south-west France (Poitou-Charentes). They were intensively taught French for three months. The commander was Commander (Capitán de Fragata) Jorge Colombo of the Argentine Naval Aviation (CANA). The deputy commander was Lieutenant Commander (Capitán de Corbeta) Augusto Bedacarratz, who with Lieutenant Junior Grade (Teniente de Fragata) Armando Mayora would also jointly use the Exocet.

They were sent to the air naval base at Landivisiau in Finistère, north-west France where they then learnt how to fly the AMD-BA Super Étendard, being given up to 50 hours of flight training each. They were also taught about the Aérospatiale AM.39 Exocet missile. The missile was named after the biological family Exocoetidae.

In July 1981, the unit returned to the Comandante Espora air naval base (Base Aeronaval Comandante Espora) in Argentina. The Argentine Navy had ordered 14 Super Étendard aircraft, and the first five arrived in December 1981. The navy had also ordered 14 air-to-surface Exocet missiles in 1979.

=== Falklands War ===
On 2 April 1982, the Argentines invaded the Falkland Islands. The Argentine Navy had not yet received a visit by a French technical team to put the Exocet missiles into operational status, and there was little hope of that happening when the French immediately put a weapons embargo on Argentina. However, two weeks later, the 2nd Squadron's technicians had worked out how to connect the missiles to the aircraft. The Argentine Navy (Armada de la República Argentina) had bought two Type 42 destroyers - the ARA Hércules and the ARA Santísima Trinidad - to practise against, which both also carried the MM-38 version of the Exocet. In late April, the squadron moved from Espora to Rio Grande.

At the time of the Falklands War, his rank was Capitán de Corbeta, which is equivalent to a Royal Navy lieutenant commander or a Royal Air Force squadron leader.

=== Attack on the Atlantic Conveyor ===
The Argentines had problems with spare parts for their airborne radar aircraft, which were effectively grounded on 15 May 1982. In their place, the AN/TPS-43 three-dimensional radar and an AN/TPS-44 radar were used from the Falkland Islands. On 25 May, the Atlantic Conveyor was spotted by the radar 110 miles north-east of the Falklands. At 7:30 am, this information was passed to the naval air base at Rio Grande (now Hermes Quijada International Airport) on the Tierra del Fuego.

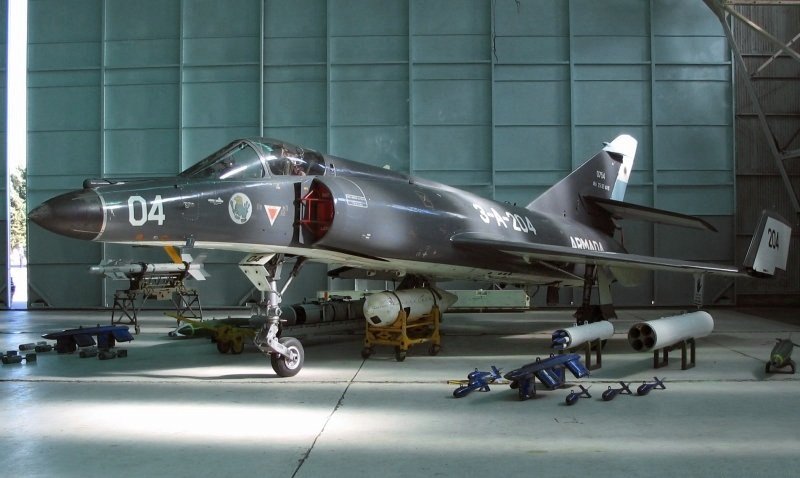
0754/3-A-204 Super Etendard, which participated in the lethal attack on 25 May 1982 on the Atlantic Conveyor

His plane, the Super Étendard 0753/3-A-203, was readied for a 9:00 am mission, but a KC-130H tanker was not available in time. Along with Super Étendard 0754/3-A-204, he took off (using a call sign "Tito") at 14:28 and rendezvoused with a KC-130H 160 miles (260 km) east of Puerto Deseado. After leaving the KC-130H, the two pilots headed 300 miles (480 km) to the south-east. At 150 miles from the target, both planes dropped to 10 metres above the sea surface. At a distance of 55 miles (89 km), the pilots detected the target, as expected, on their onboard radar; three targets appeared. They launched Exocets at 16:32 from 31 miles (50 km) away, which hit the ship at 16:35. The ship caught fire and sank three days later while under tow. Both planes travelled 1,620 miles (2,610 km) in the operation in 3 hours and 50 minutes. Without refuelling, the aircraft had a range of 380 miles (610 km), and at low level used 70 litres of fuel per minute. Argentina had two tanker aircraft available. Both planes returned to Puerto Deseado. Only HMS Ambuscade had picked up the planes on its radar. After the operation, the Argentines had one operational Exocet left.

Curilovic was awarded the Medal of Valour in Combat (La Nación Argentina al Valor en Combate) in 1984. He received the Naval Merit Order (Al Mérito Naval) in 1987 from the Brazilian Navy (Marinha do Brasil).

On 16 August 2011, he gave a talk at the Centro de Graduados del Liceo Naval Militar (Naval Military Lyceum Graduate Centre) entitled SuperEtendard Squadron, a nightmare for the British fleet (Spanish: Escuadrilla de SuperEtendard, una pesadilla para la flota británica).

== Personal life ==
Roberto Curilovic was born on January 3, 1947, in the capital, Buenos Aires. He is of Croatian descent. His ancestors immigrated to Argentina from the village of Pećurkovo brdo not far from Duga Resa. His father, Roko Ćurilović, (he later changed his name to Roque Curilovic) emigrated to Argentina in 1926 and married to Isis Taricano (whose mother is a Croat from Split). They had only one child, a son Roberto. Roberto was married in 1970 to Editha Radalj, daughter of Argentine Croats, with whom he has daughters Debora and Barbara and son Robert Martin.

Curilovic was later appointed Secretary of State for the Navy at the Argentine Ministry of Defense. Today he works as an expert consultant for a number of defense companies that operate in Argentina and around the world.

== See also ==
- Weapons of the Falklands War
- Argentine air forces in the Falklands War
- Pablo Carballo
