= Peter Harris =

Pete or Peter Harris may refer to:

== Sportspeople ==
- Pete Harris (American football) (1957–2006), American football player
- Peter Harris (boxer) (born 1962), Welsh boxer
- Peter Harris (surfer) (born 1958), Australian surfer
- Peter Harris (footballer) (1925–2003), English association football (soccer) player

== Businessmen ==
- Peter L. Harris (born 1943), American businessman
- Peter R. Harris, former CEO of Compass Group
- Peter Harris (entrepreneur) (born 1934), English businessman

== Others ==
- Peter Harris, Australian musician with Madden and Harris
- Peter Harris (buccaneer) (died 1680), 17th-century pirate
- Peter Harris (director) (1933–2021), British television director
- Peter Harris (producer) (born 1961), electronic dance music record producer and disc jockey
- Peter Harris (public servant), Australian government official
- Peter Harris (RAF officer), British pilot
- Peter Charles Harris (1865–1951), officer in the U.S. Army
- Fr. Pete Harris, character in the American TV series Zoo

== See also ==
- Peter Harrison (disambiguation)
