= Touch-and-go landing =

Flying maneuver

A touch-and-go of an Airbus A340-500 of the Royal Thai Air Force at Phuket Airport

In aviation, a touch-and-go landing (TGL) or circuit is a maneuver that is common when learning to fly a fixed-wing aircraft. It involves landing on a runway and taking off again without coming to a full stop. Usually the pilot then circles the airport in a defined pattern known as a circuit and repeats the maneuver. This allows many landings to be practiced in a short time.

If the pilot brings the aircraft to a full stop before taking off again, it is known as a "stop-and-go". If the aircraft's wheels do not touch the ground, it is known as a "low pass". Both a touch-and-go landing and a low pass are types of go-around. An unplanned touch-and-go landing is also called a "rejected landing" or "balked landing".

Touch-and-go landings can perform a crucial safety role when a plane lands with not enough space to come to a complete stop, but has enough space to accelerate and take off again.

== Standard procedure ==
In a normal landing, the pilot flies the traffic pattern and establishes the aircraft on final approach. As the aircraft crosses the threshold of the runway the pilot executes the landing flare, touches the aircraft down, and immediately applies braking, ground spoilers, and (if available) reverse thrust until the aircraft has decelerated enough to exit onto a taxiway. In a touch-and-go landing, after the wheels are down, the pilot does not apply the brakes but instead increases the engine power to full, partially retracts the flaps, accelerates back to rotation speed, and lifts off again.

At a towered airport, the pilot must receive ATC permission to perform a touch-and-go landing by requesting it by name or as "the option," which allows the pilot to perform a touch-and-go, stop-and-go, low approach, full-stop landing or go-around as desired.

At a non-towered airport, the pilot announces position and intent over the CTAF or UNICOM radio frequency to coordinate the flow of local air traffic with any other pilots.

== Debate over role in flight instruction ==
Some flight instructors believe touch-and-gos should not be heavily used, if at all, with student pilots. They argue that this procedure results in less attention to learning to land properly, and thus creates safety problems. They note that neither the Federal Aviation Administration's Practical Test Standards nor its Airplane Flying Handbook discusses touch-and-gos.

Instructors who favor the use of touch-and-gos contend that it makes it possible to practice more landings per hour of instruction. Students doing touch-and-gos find it easier to master landing, particularly the final stage known as landing flare, which is often difficult to learn. Preparing to take off while landing is a necessary safety skill, they add, because any pilot must be able to do it in order to reject a landing.

== Commercial aviation ==
As a result of the Australian government's Two Airlines Policy, airlines other than Ansett Australia and Trans Australia Airlines were not permitted to operate routes directly between major cities. To circumvent this policy, East-West Airlines would perform touch-and-go landings in smaller cities along the way. For instance, East-West's Melbourne to Sydney route included a touch-and-go landing at Albury Airport, on the border of New South Wales and Victoria.

== Carrier aviation ==
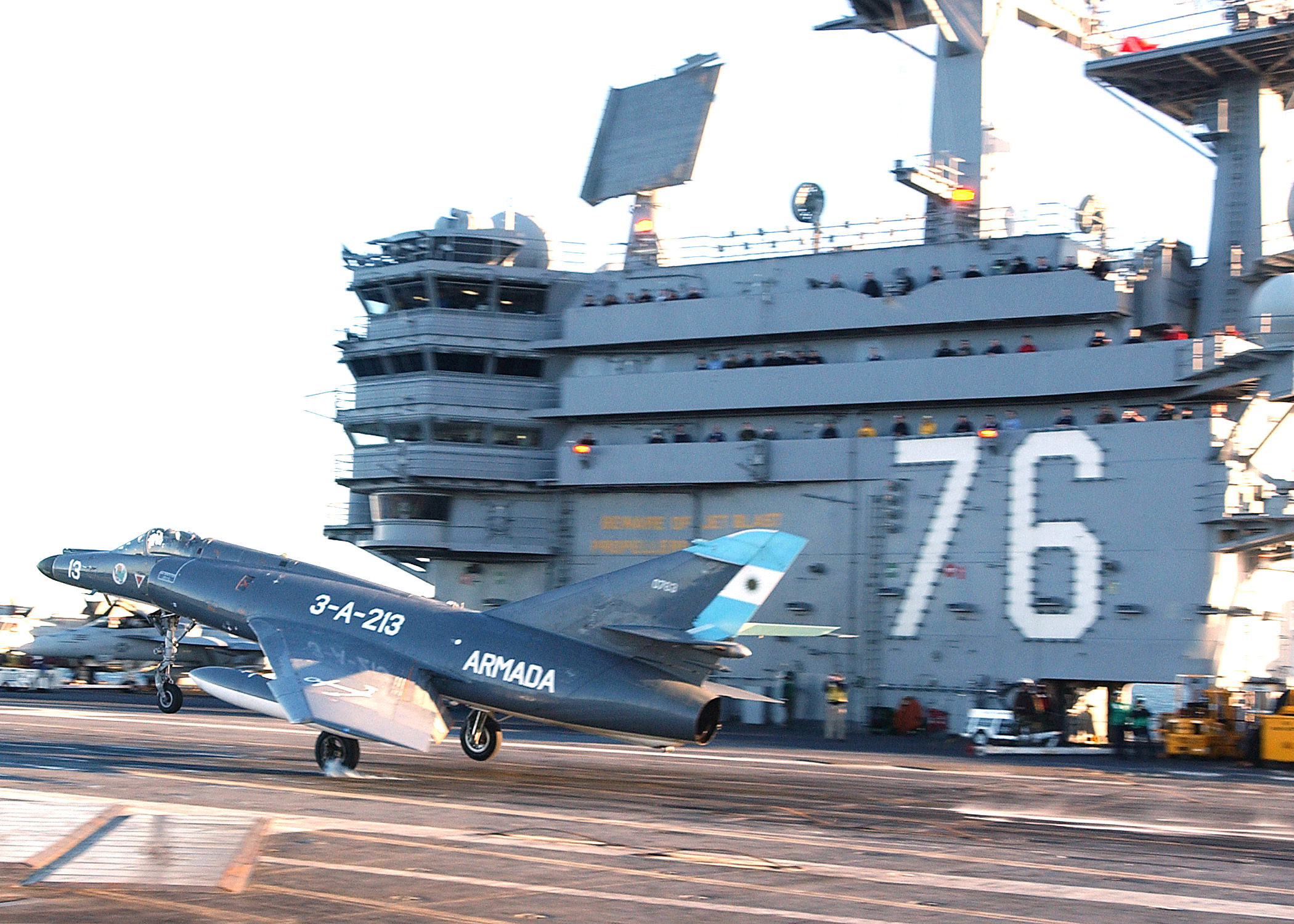
An Argentine Navy Super Étendard commencing a touch-and-go landing on USS Ronald Reagan during Gringo-Gaucho joint US-Argentine manoeuvres.

In the United States Navy, touch-and-go landings are part of training for carrier pilots. If they have been away from a carrier for 29 days, they must do practice on a land runway and then do so at sea within 10 days. Before a carrier goes on patrol, pilots will conduct training. For example, before USS Ronald Reagan left on its summer 2016 patrol, it planned to conduct 4200 touch-and-go landings.
