= FRA 40 =

America's Cup boat

FRA-40
- Other names: NZL-40
- Yacht club: Yacht Club d'Antibes
- Nation: France
- Class: International America's Cup Class
- Sail no: FRA-40 (also NZL-40)
- Designer(s): Luc Bouvet, Olivier Petit
- Launched: 1995
- Owner(s): Défi France; FAST2000
- Fate: Scrapped

Racing career
- America's Cup: 1995, 2000

Specifications
- Type: Monohull
- Displacement: 24 tons (ballast 19 tons)
- Length: 22 m (72 ft) (LOA); 18.5 m (61 ft) (LWL)
- Beam: 4.9 m (16 ft)
- Draft: 4.0 m (13.1 ft)
- Sail area: 350 m^{2} (3,800 sq ft)
- Crew: 16

Notes
- Sailed as tourist charter in Auckland and Sydney until scrapped

FRA 40 (also known as Harmonie and NZL-40) was a former America's Cup boat designed and built for the 1995 America's Cup. The yacht was originally designed and built for the Le Défi France syndicate for the 1995 Cup, sponsored by the Yacht Club d’Antibes, but was not completed in time and never raced as a result of the syndicate running into financial trouble. The boat was then sold Marc Pajot's FAST2000 syndicate and brought to Auckland where it was used as a training and trial boat prior to the development of the infamous double keeled SUI-59 Be Happy.

== History ==
Following the successful defense of the America's Cup by Bill Koch's syndicate in 1992, a number of international syndicates formed to challenge for the 1995 29th America's Cup also to be sailed in San Diego. For this Cup, a small syndicate led by Jacques Dewailly, assisted by Eric Ogden, Marc Bouët and Paul Cayard, was formed but their boat FRA-40 was not completed in time and the syndicate collapsed shortly aftwards as a result of lack of funds. The boat was designed by well-known naval architect duo Luc Bouvet and Olivier Petit, in collaboration with Bernard Nivelt.

Following the collapse of the original syndicate, and the boat was brought to Auckland, New Zealand, by the Le Défi Sud Challenge sponsored by the Yacht Club de Cannes / Société Nautique Grau-du-Roi - Port Camargue, for the 30th America's Cup. However, as with the boats previous owners, despite having the boat in Auckland, the challenge did not succeed and the entry was officially withdrawal at the same time as the St. Petersburg Yacht Club / Age of Russia Challenge. The boat was then sold to Marc Pajot's Swiss FAST2000 syndicate, where it was rebranded and used as a training and trial boat for that syndicates primary entry, the infamous twin-keeled yacht, Be Happy.

When the Swiss syndicate ran into financial trouble, the boat was sold to a local charter company and rebranded NZL-40, becoming a well-known tourist attraction in the Viaduct Harbour, where it operated for many years, before finally being relocated (and rebranded once again to AUS-40) to Sydney, Australia, before finally being scrapped

== Other ==
As NZL-40, the boat became a regular sight on Auckland's Waitemata Harbour and coastal racing scene, winning line honours in the well-known yacht race between Auckland and the Bay of Islands (the Coastal Classic) several times. While operating in Auckland, the boat was paired with former Nippon Challenge sailboat JPN-41, also designed for the 1995 San Diego America's Cup, which was brought to New Zealand by Peter Harrison's GBR Challenge.
