= Gringo–Gaucho =

US-Argentine naval maneuvers

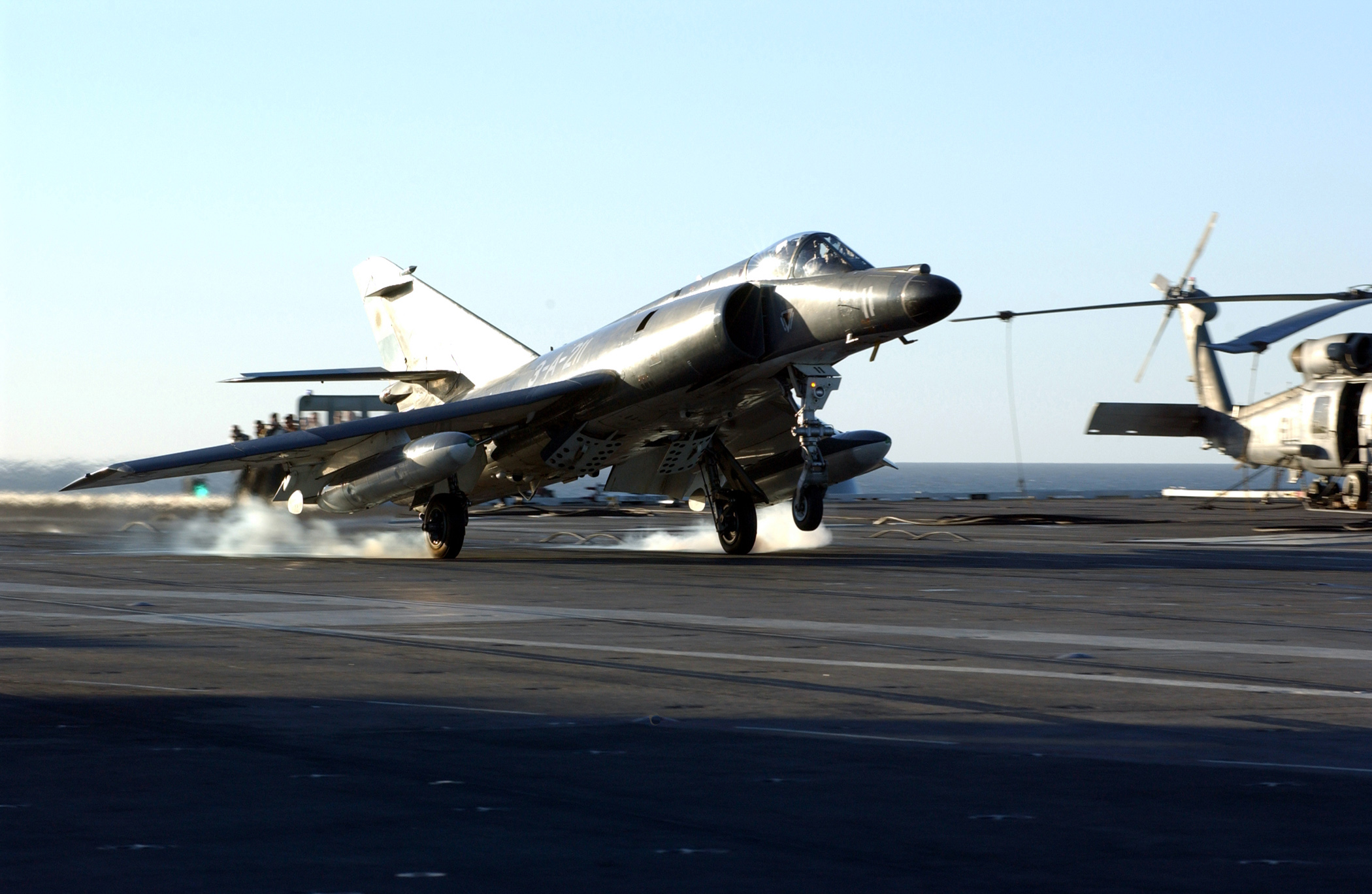
Super Etendard on USS Ronald Reagan

Gringo–Gaucho are a contingent set of maneuvers performed between the Argentine Naval Aviation and United States Navy's aircraft carriers. The US Navy refers to them as Southern Seas in their last edition. Gringo and Gaucho are linguistic and folkloric designations of long standing, respectively.

== History ==
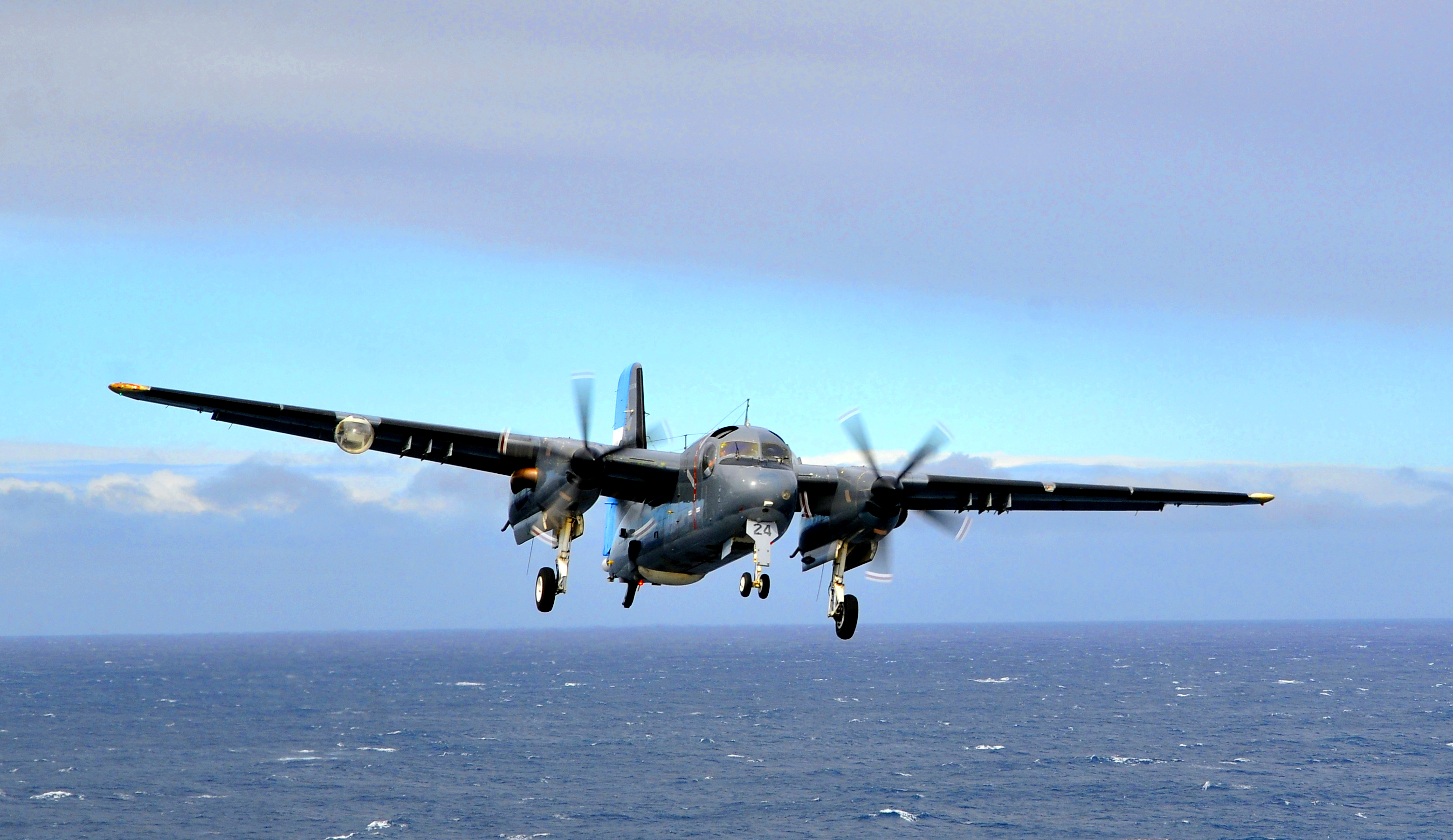
S-2T Turbo Tracker approaching USS Carl Vinson

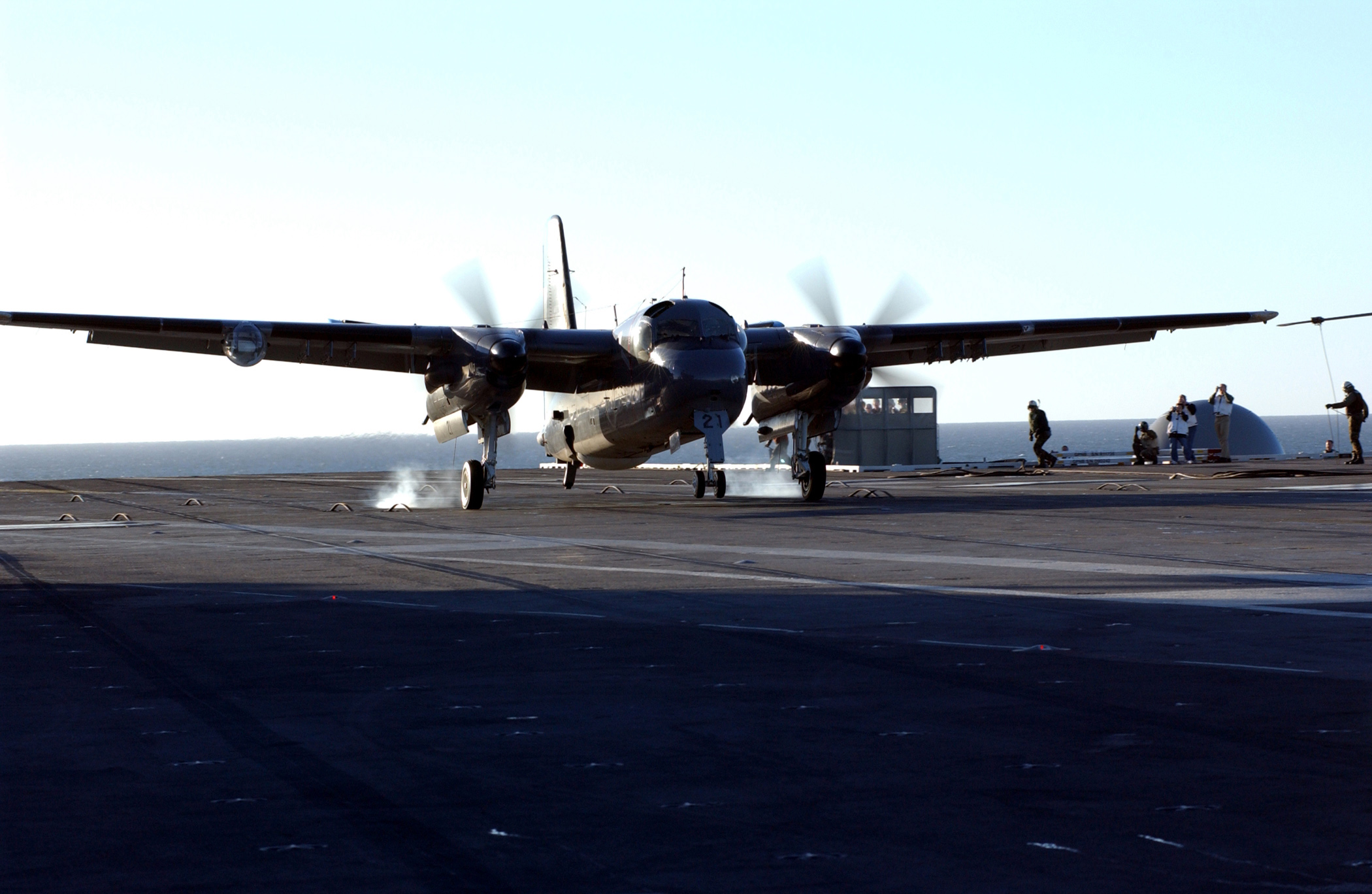
Touch-and-go on USS Ronald Reagan

The Argentine Navy continuously operated an aircraft carrier from 1959 to 1990. When ARA Veinticinco de Mayo was retired, it was decided to keep an embarked air group with the hope of operating a carrier again in the future. In order to qualify the pilots, the traditional friendship with the Brazilian Navy allowed Argentine naval aviators to operate from the deck of the Brazilian aircraft carriers Minas Gerais and São Paulo during ARAEX exercises. The only other choice available was with the United States. As the United States Navy does not maintain regular deployments of aircraft carriers in the South Atlantic it is necessary to wait for one of them to perform a transit within Argentine coastal waters. The opportunities occur when the ships perform a transit around South America to move between the East and West coasts of the United States since they are too large for the Panama Canal. The exercise is coordinated by US Naval Forces Southern Command, but unlike the Sao Paulo the Argentine aircraft solely perform touch-and-go landings. CSG-10 and USS George Washington conducted Gringo–Gaucho 2024.

== Aircraft ==
- Dassault-Breguet Super Étendard (2da Escuadrilla Aeronaval de Caza y Ataque)
- Grumman/IAI S-2T Turbo Tracker (Naval Antisubmarine Squadron)
- Alouette III and Eurocopter Fennec (1st Naval Helicopter Squadron) as SAR aircraft
- Sikorsky/Agusta S-61 Sea King (2nd Naval Helicopter Squadron) for general support duties

== List of operations ==
- 1990, March: USS Constellation on transit for her Service Life Extension Program (SLEP)
- 1990, October: USS Abraham Lincoln
- 1991, November: USS Kitty Hawk, including port visit to Mar del Plata
- 1993: USS Constellation on the way back to the Pacific Ocean after SLEP
- 2001: USS Nimitz. Cancelled due budget restrictions per Argentine economic crisis
- 2004: USS Ronald Reagan^{video}
- 2008:USS George Washington
- 2010: USS Carl Vinson^{video}
- 2024: USS George Washington (CVN-73) (Gringo-Gaucho II)

== Gallery ==
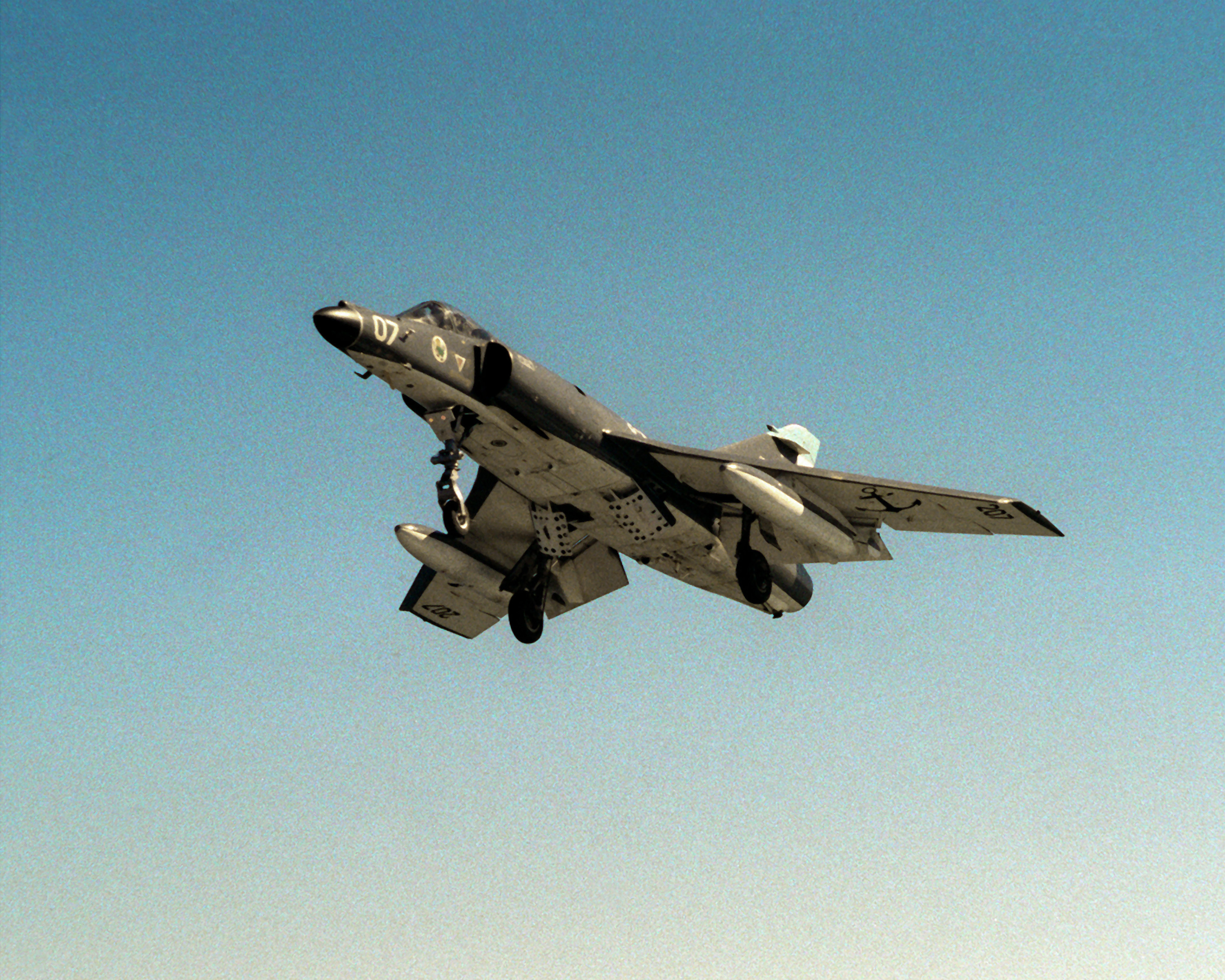
Super Etendard approaching USS Abraham Lincoln

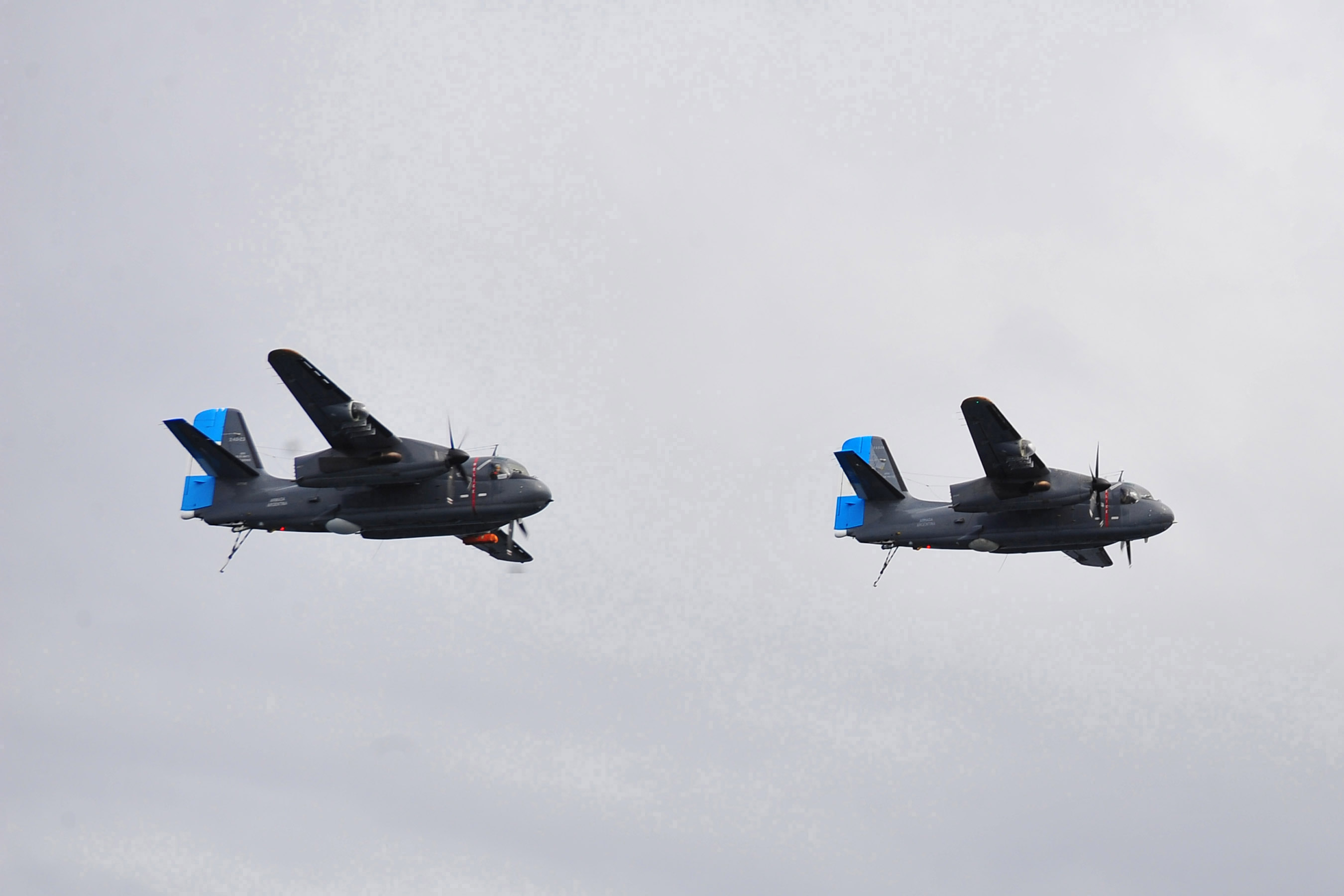
Trackers overflying the USS Carl Vinson

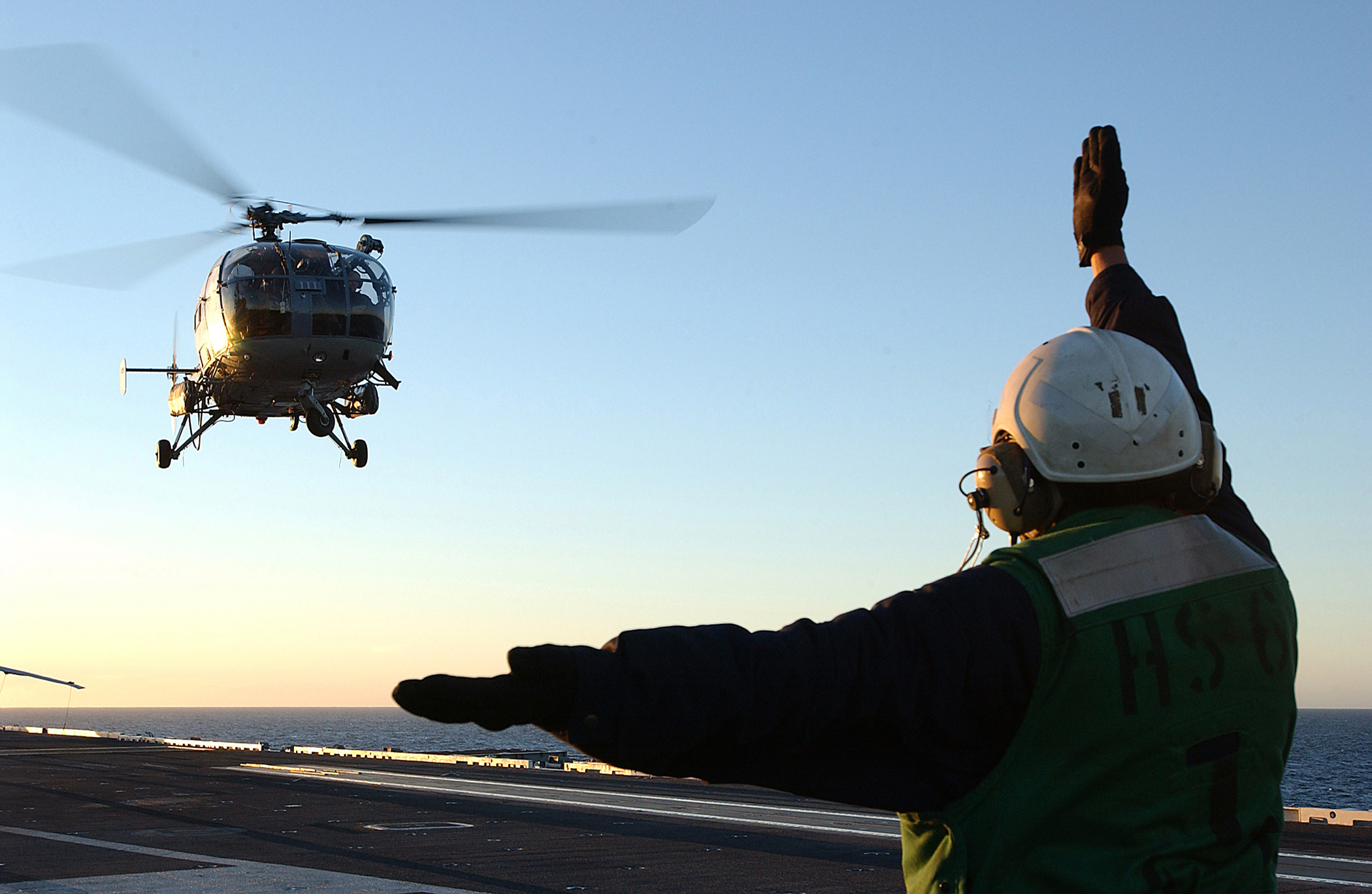
Alouette III acting as SAR helo on USS Ronald Reagan

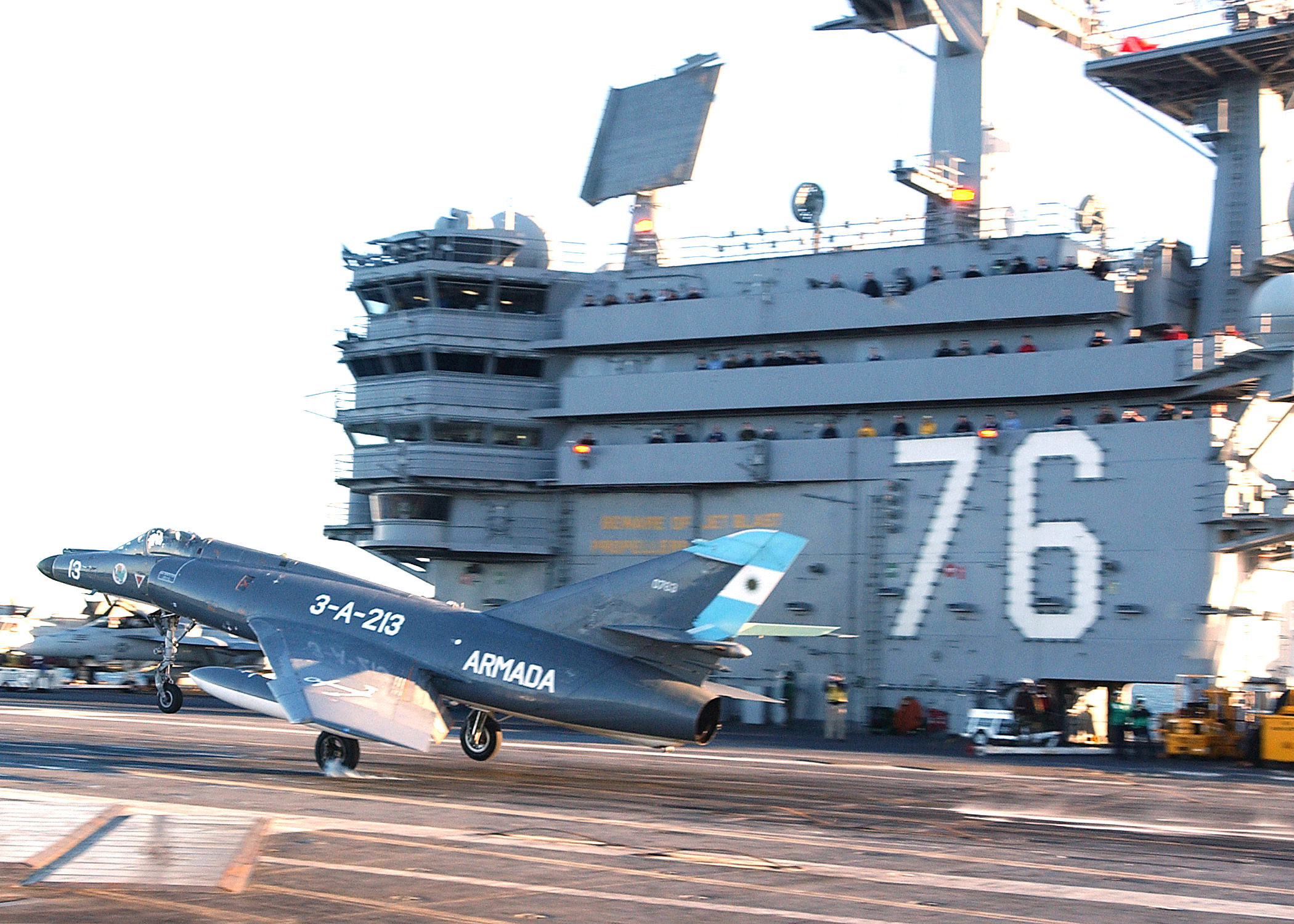
Super Etendard on USS Ronald Reagan

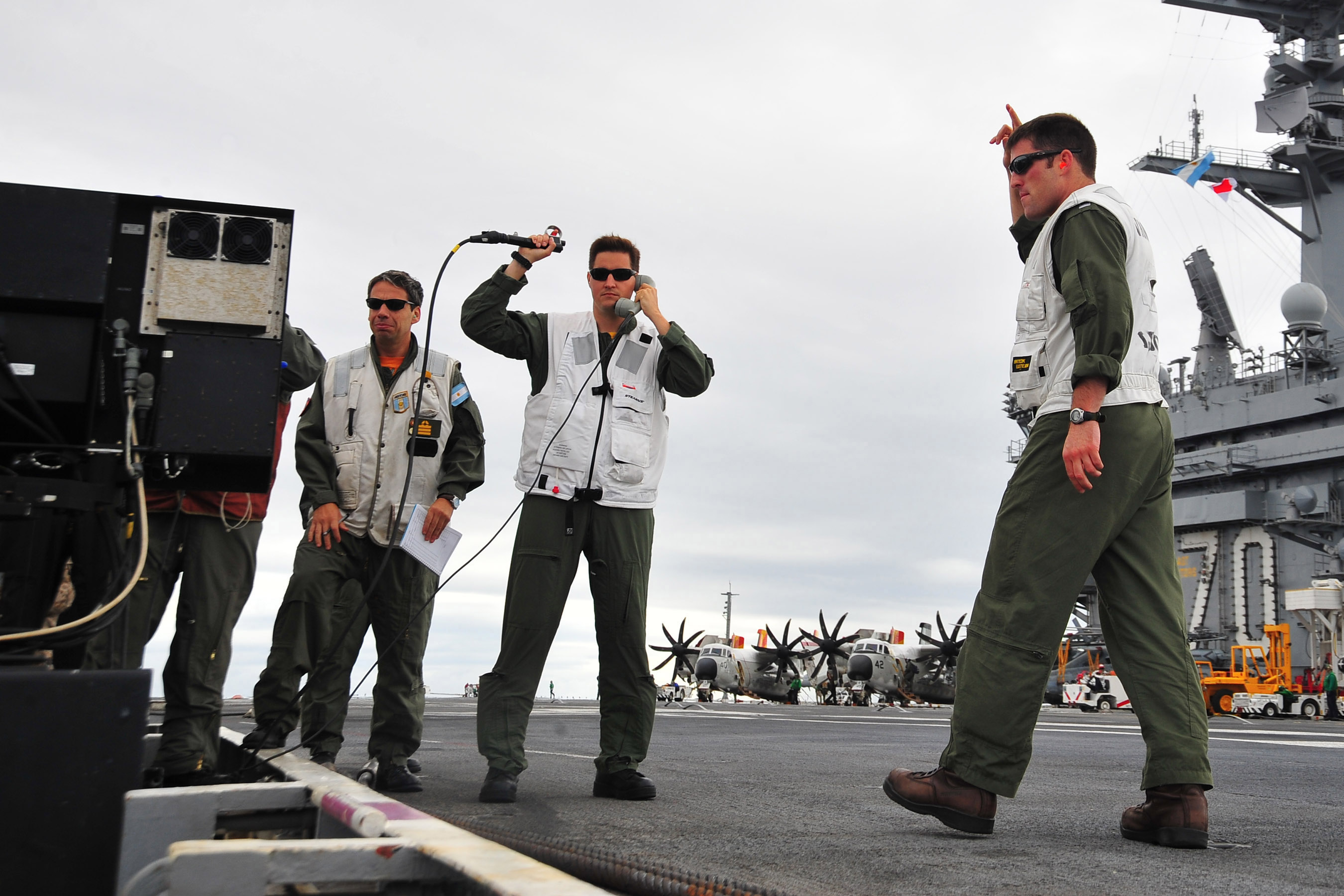
Landing signal officer on USS Carl Vinson

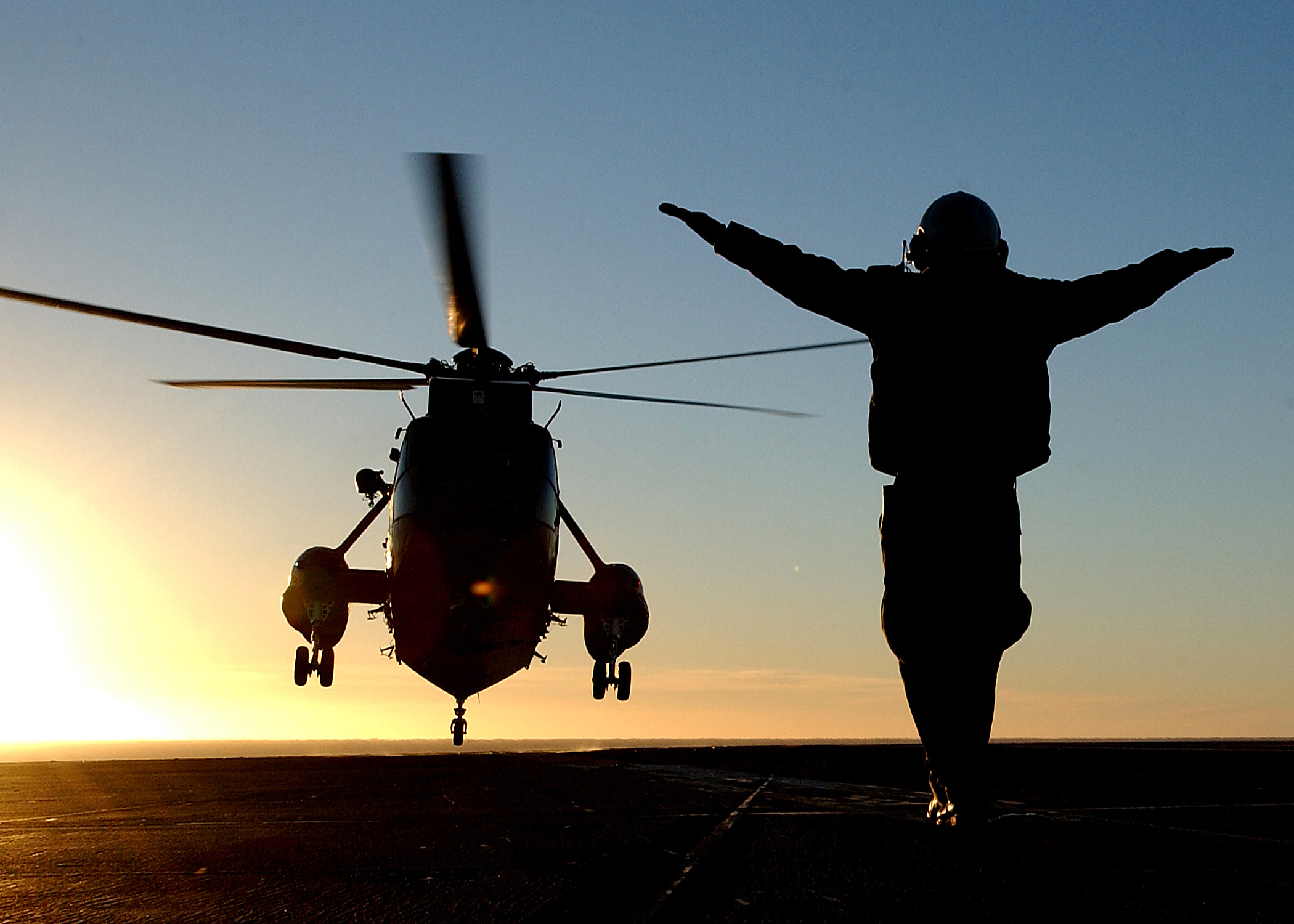
H-3 Sea King on USS Ronald Reagan

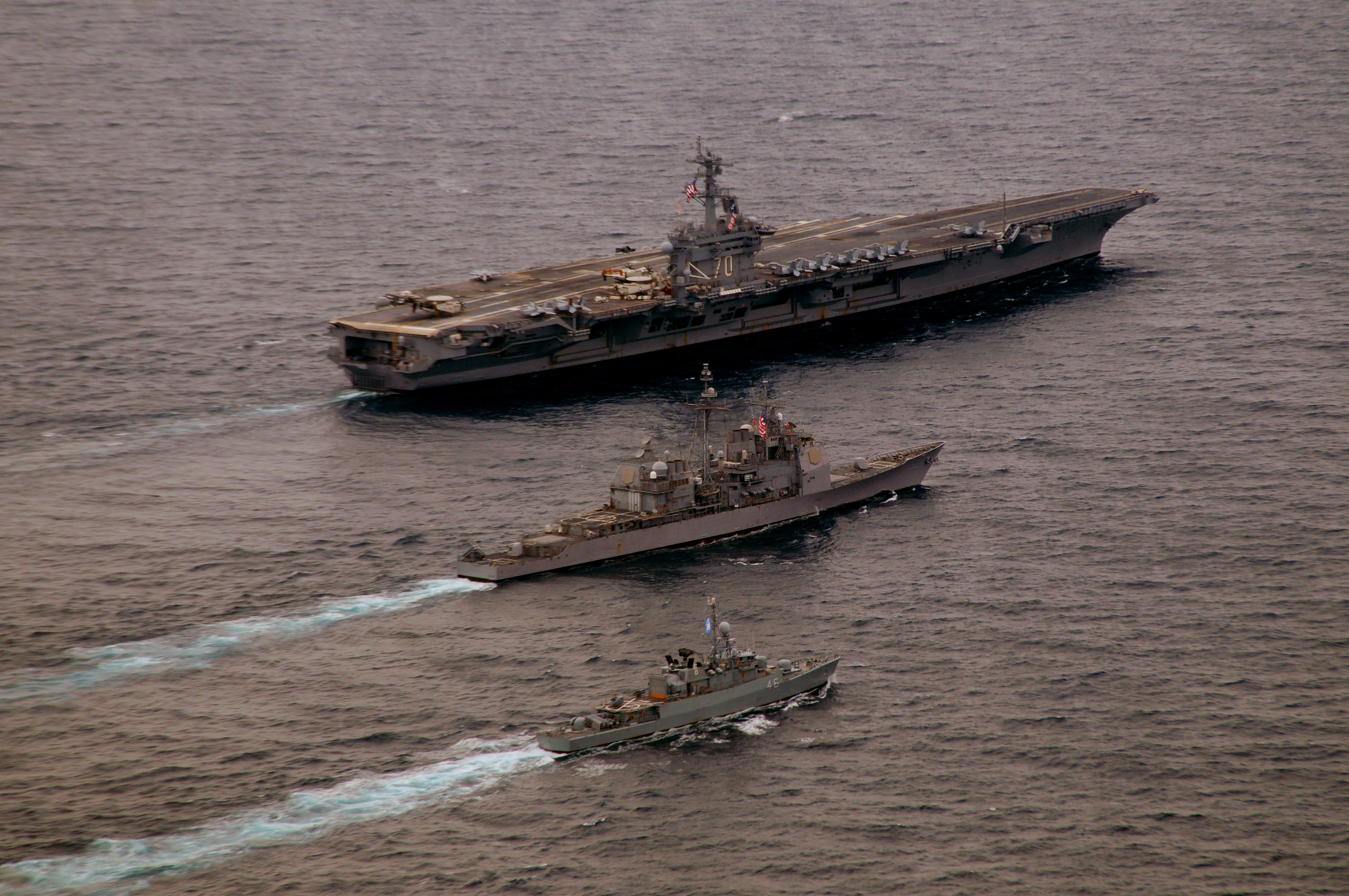
Gringo-Gaucho 2010

== See also ==
- South America air forces maneuvers
