= Peter Harris (RAF officer) =

British military pilot

Peter Harris is a British aircraft pilot and former two star senior officer of the Royal Air Force (RAF) with extensive flying and command experience.

== Early years ==
Harris recalls his first flying experience as the flight from England to Kenya in a C-4 Argonaut when his family moved there when he was 7 years old. When aged 12, he did two trial flights in a Cessna 150 and became hooked on flying.

== RAF career ==
Harris joined the RAF as an officer having successfully demonstrated his potential as a pilot at RAF Biggin Hill, and while completing school was sponsored for initial flying training and at 17 years of age obtained a Private pilot license. After school, at RAF Cranwell, he flew the Chipmunk and Jet Provost and gained the RAF wings.

Harris was streamed into 'fast jet' and was trained for the Hawker Siddeley Harrier. Over his career he flew around 2500 hours in this type.

He then flew the SEPECAT Jaguar before returning to the Harrier GR.3.

=== Falklands War ===
Harris was among the pilots who flew the Harrier GR.3s from Britain to Ascension Island then onto MV Atlantic Conveyor for the journey to the Falklands War at the Falkland Islands, then onto HMS Hermes from which the RAF contingent operated.

=== Exchange service ===
Harris was selected for an exchange with the US Navy and US Air Force during which his expertise with the Harrier assisted the US Marines specification of the AV-8B while part of the Aircraft Systems Advisory Panel (ASAP) while working closely with McDonnell Douglas.

During this period, MD invited Harris to fly the experimental YAV-8B at Whiteman Air Force Base.

Harris converted to the Douglas A-4 Skyhawk (A-4M variant) and LTV A-7 Corsair II (A-7E variant). He eventually qualified to conduct carrier landings and did 6 in an A-4 and 10 in an A-7 plus associated catapult launches.

Harris was able to convert into the General Dynamics F-16 Fighting Falcon.

=== RAF ===
On return to the UK, Harris served as commanding officer of 4 Squadron RAF.

On promotion, he was station commander of RAF Laarbruch in western Germany and there flew the Tornado F3.

After selection to air commodore (one-star rank) rank, Harris commanded the British forces in Operation Bolton, the RAF component of Operation Southern Watch against Iraq.

He also participated in planning for the NATO operations of the Kosovo war, while based in Sarajevo.

On promotion to air vice marshal (two-star rank), he commanded No. 1 Group RAF. Then, he headed the Permanent Joint Headquarters (PJHQ), the British tri-service headquarters from where all overseas military operations are planned and controlled.

When offered promotion to air marshal (three-star rank), the two appointments offered were not to his liking, and Harris retired from the RAF.

== Interests ==
Harris retains an interest in flying. When asked for the aircraft types he would have liked to have flown, he listed the SR-71 and the Space Shuttle.

== Memorable flights ==
In 1976, Harris was the pilot of the Pink Harrier T (2-seat) from Dijon Air Base to RAF Wittering. The brief exchange was with a French Air Force wing at Dijon, which had a symbol of a Stork commemorating the WW1 ace Georges Guynemer. A stork was adorned with a Harrier symbol, and the French squadron reciprocated and painted an RAF aircraft in pink paint.
