= Pablo Carballo =

Argentine military pilot (born 1947)

Pablo Marcos Rafael Carballo
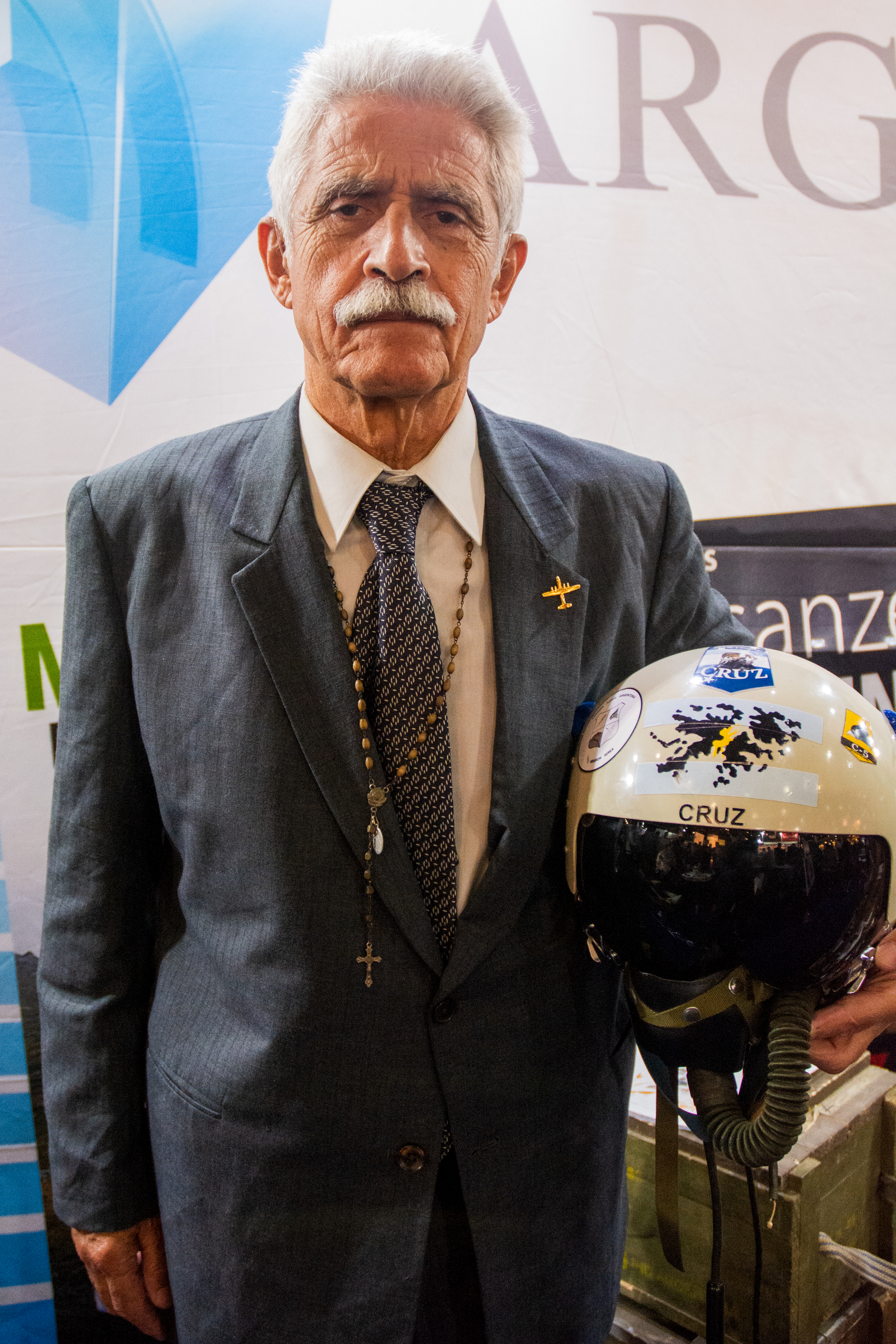
- Pablo Carballo in 2025
- Born: December 11, 1947 (age 78); Buenos Aires, Argentina
- Military career
- Allegiance: Argentina
- Branch: Argentine Air Force
- Service years: 1971–2001
- Rank: Commodore
- Conflicts: Falklands War
- Awards: Argentine Nation to the Heroic Valour in Combat Cross, the Argentinian Congressional Medal, and the Highest Distinction of the Argentinian Air Force.
- Other work: Professor, Escuela de Aviación Militar, Córdoba (currently)

Commodore Pablo Marcos Rafael Carballo (born 11 December 1947) is a retired member of the Argentinian Air Force - the Fuerza Aérea Argentina (FAA) - who fought in the 1982 Falklands War where he participated in actions that led to the sinking of three Royal Navy ships. He was awarded the highest national military decoration: the Argentine Nation to the Heroic Valour in Combat Cross, the Argentinian Congressional Medal, and the Highest Distinction of the Argentinian Air Force.

== Career ==
Ensign Carballo graduated as a pilot in the 37th class of Escuela de Aviación Militar (Military Flying School) of the FAA at Córdoba in 1971. In 1972, he graduated as a fighter pilot in the 4th Air Brigade ( Spanish: IV Brigada Aérea ) at El Plumerillo, Mendoza flying Morane-Saulnier MS-760 Paris and North American F-86 Sabres. He was then assigned as a cadet instructor of the Cordoba Flying School.

In 1979, he was assigned to the 5th Air Brigade ( Spanish: V Brigada Aérea ), Villa Reynolds, San Luis Province to fly A-4B Skyhawks where he was promoted from section leader to brigade chief of operations. He then served on 6th Air Brigade ( Spanish: VI Brigada Aérea ) at Tandil flying Fingers and Mirage III becoming the squadron chief.

=== Falklands (Malvinas) War ===
In 1982 Captain Carballo was section leader at 5th Air Brigade flying A-4B Skyhawks. The unit deployed to the southern airfield Puerto Santa Cruz ^{ap} and airbase Rio Gallegos in Santa Cruz Province when hostilities broke out.

He took part in the following missions: ( showing: approximate local time | Aircraft | Call signal )

- 1 May 17:30 : C-215 Flight Trueno. In their first ever combat mission four A-4B mistakenly attacked the ELMA cargo ship Formosa near Port Stanley in a friendly fire incident; fortunately without casualties. The ship returned to the mainland carrying a 500 lb unexploded bomb.
- 21 May 13:00 : C-204 Flight Mula. Two A-4B entered San Carlos Water. "Mula 2" (Pilot Ensign Carmona) attacked an unknown ship, having expended his ordnance, Carballo ordered him to return to base. Carballo continued alone and attacked HMS Ardent straddling her with two bombs, both of which failed to explode.
- 23 May 13:30 : C-228 Flight Nene. Four A-4B attacked HMS Antelope. Carballo's plane was damaged by a Sea Cat missile while on his bombing run, so he broke off from the attack and returned safely to Rio Gallegos. Two unexploded bombs hit the ship after the attack, one of which detonated while being defused, sinking the ship.
- 25 May 15:20 : C-225 Flight Vulcano Two A-4B (flying with Lt Carlos Rinke) attacked HMS Broadsword which was providing anti-aircraft missile cover for HMS Coventry, which itself was acting as a decoy to draw attacks away. Broadsword's Sea Wolf missile system developed a technical fault and could not be fired at the Skyhawks. The bomb bounced off the sea passed through the ship damaging the frigate's communication systems, hydraulics and electrics systems and shattering the nose of her Sea Lynx helicopter before exploding without causing further damage. In the same action, another flight (Zeus flown by 1st Lt Velazco and Ensign Barrionuevo) sank the destroyer HMS Coventry
- 27 May 16:58 : Flight Póker Two A-4B (again with Lt Rinke) struck ground targets at Ajax Bay. Each aircraft carrying four 500 lb retarding bombs, causing 5 deaths and 26 injuries.
- 08 Jun : Flights Dogo and Mastín with four A-4B each carrying three 500 lb retarding tail bombs attacked landing ships at Fitzroy. Carballo (and two other pilots) were forced to return to base when near to the target due to mechanical problems. A second wave of eight Grupo 4 A-4C (Flights Mazo and Yunque) were later deployed on this mission, with three shot down by Sea Harriers.
- 12 June: C-221 Flight Paris. Two A-4B, Paris 2 (Lt Rinke's plane) had a fire on departure and the mission was aborted.

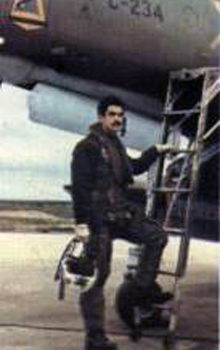
Cpt Pablo Carballo depicted in 1983

==== Aircraft ====
The A-4P Skyhawk (called A-4B by the Argentines) were bought from the US Navy inventory in 1966 and at the time of the war were painted green/brown topsides with light blue undersides heavily faded colours. Yellows identity markings were also added during the conflict.

These aircraft provided outstanding performance and availability even in the harsh operating conditions of the South Atlantic with most of them returning from missions with some form of battle damage and were patched up and pressed back into service within matter of hours. Because of this, pilots used to change airframes between sorties.

In spite of using two 295-gallon drop tanks they needed aerial refueling twice during missions. The ordnance used during the conflict were one British-made 1000 lb Mk 17 bomb or four Spanish-made 500 lb retarding tail Expal-Explosivos Alaveses (named BRP). American 500 lb retarding tail Mark 82 bombs ("Snake Eye") were also available but used infrequently. The aircraft were also armed with two 20 mm cannons but without any air-to-air missile, Radar warning receiver or chaff for self-defence.

=== Later career ===
Carballo later became Chief of the Weapons Test Center ( Spanish: Centro de Ensayos de Armamentos y Sistemas Operativos ) at Cordoba and passed a Master on Strategy at the USAF Air War College, before becoming Director of INAC (Spanish: Instituto Nacional de Aviación Civil), the Argentinian civil aviation school

He retired from the Air Force on April 2, 2001, as a Comodoro (USAF equivalent: Colonel and RAF equivalent: Group Captain )

As of 2006, he was professor of the Flying School at Cordoba.

== See also ==
- Roberto Curilovic

== Publications ==
- 1985, Halcones sobre Malvinas (Hawks over the Falklands) ISBN 950-9294-07-1
- 1999, Dios Y Los Halcones (God and the Hawks) ISBN 987-96336-1-X
- 2005, Halcones de Malvinas (Hawks of the Falklands) ISBN 987-22293-0-9
