= SS Atlantic Conveyor =

British merchant navy ship

Coordinates: 50°40′S 54°28′W

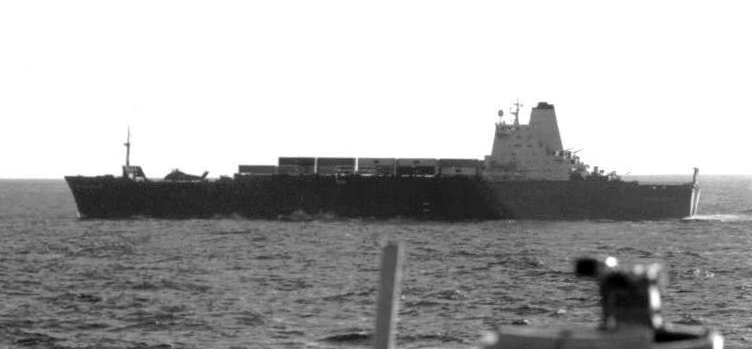
- Atlantic Conveyor approaching the Falklands c. 19 May 1982

History

United Kingdom
- Name: Atlantic Conveyor
- Operator: Cunard Line
- Builder: Swan Hunter, Tyne and Wear, United Kingdom
- Launched: 25 August 1969
- Completed: March 1970
- Identification: IMO number: 6926036
- Fate: struck by two Exocet missiles on 25 May 1982; Burnt and subsequently abandoned; Eventually sank whilst under tow on 28 May 1982

General characteristics
- Type: Container ship
- Tonnage: 14,946 GRT
- Length: 695 ft (212 m)
- Beam: 92 ft (28 m)
- Draught: 9,1 m
- Propulsion: 4 steam turbines, 2 propellers
- Speed: 23 knots (43 km/h; 26 mph)

Atlantic Conveyor was a British Merchant Navy container ship, registered in Liverpool, that was requisitioned by the Ministry of Defence during the Falklands War. She was struck on 25 May 1982 by two Argentine air-launched AM39 Exocet missiles, killing 12 sailors. The ship sank under tow on 28 May, becoming the first British merchant vessel lost to enemy action since the Second World War.

The wrecksite is designated under the Protection of Military Remains Act 1986.

== History ==
Atlantic Conveyor was a 14,950 GRT roll-on, roll-off container ship owned by Cunard. She was built along with six other container ships, each named with the prefix Atlantic, and each sailing under different national flags by different companies for the Atlantic Container Line consortium.

=== Falklands War ===
Along with her sister ship, Atlantic Causeway, Atlantic Conveyor was requisitioned by the Ministry of Defence at the beginning of the Falklands War in early April 1982, through the STUFT (ship taken up from trade) system. Because of the short time available, a decision that the ship was not "a high-value unit", and a controversy over whether arming civilian auxiliary vessels was legal, Atlantic Conveyor was not fitted with either an active or a passive defence system.

The ships were used to carry supplies for the Royal Navy Task Force sent by the British government to retake the Falkland Islands from Argentine occupation. Sailing for Ascension Island on 25 April 1982, Atlantic Conveyor carried a cargo of one Westland Lynx helicopter of 815 Naval Air Squadron (NAS) and six Westland Wessex helicopters of 848 NAS of the Royal Navy’s Fleet Air Arm; and five Royal Air Force (RAF) Boeing Vertol Chinook HC.1s from No. 18 Squadron. Another Wessex, of 845 NAS, was also on board for operational use. At Ascension, eight Fleet Air Arm Sea Harriers (of 809 NAS) and six RAF Harrier GR.3s were landed on her deck.

One Chinook of B Flight, No. 18 Squadron, left Atlantic Conveyor to support operations on Ascension. With the Harriers stored on her deck, she then set sail for the South Atlantic. On her arrival off the Falklands in mid-May, all of the Harriers were flown off to the carriers; the GR.3s went to HMS Hermes while the Sea Harriers were divided amongst the existing squadrons on Hermes and HMS Invincible.

=== Sinking ===
On 25 May 1982 (the same day as the loss of HMS Coventry) Atlantic Conveyor was hit by two AM39 Exocet missiles launched by two Argentine Navy Super Étendard jet maritime strike aircraft. The mission was led by Captain Roberto Curilovic (call sign 'Tito'), flying Super Étendard 0753/3-A-203 and his wingman, Lieutenant Julio Barraza (call sign 'Leo') flying in 0754/3-A-204 from 2da Escuadrilla Aeronaval de Caza y Ataque (2nd Naval Air Fighter Attack Squadron).

Both Exocets struck Atlantic Conveyor on the port quarter of the ship. There are conflicting accounts on whether the warheads exploded after penetrating the ship's hull, or on impact.Prince Andrew (Andrew Mountbatten-Windsor), who witnessed the missiles exploding, reported that debris caused "splashes in the water about a quarter of a mile away". He said that the incident "was an experience I shall never forget ... horrific". All the survivors were taken to HMS Hermes.

Because fuel and ammunition were stored below decks, the incendiary effect of the unburnt propellant from the missiles caused an uncontrollable fire. When the fire had burnt out, the ship was boarded but nothing was recovered. While under tow by the requisitioned tug Irishman, Atlantic Conveyor sank in the early morning of 28 May 1982. Six Wessexes, three Chinooks and a Lynx were destroyed by fire; only one Chinook (ZA718, that became known as 'Bravo November') and the 845 NAS Wessex survived, by dint of being already off the ship at the time of the attack. The loss of these helicopters meant that British troops had to march on foot across the Falklands to recapture Stanley.

== Crew ==
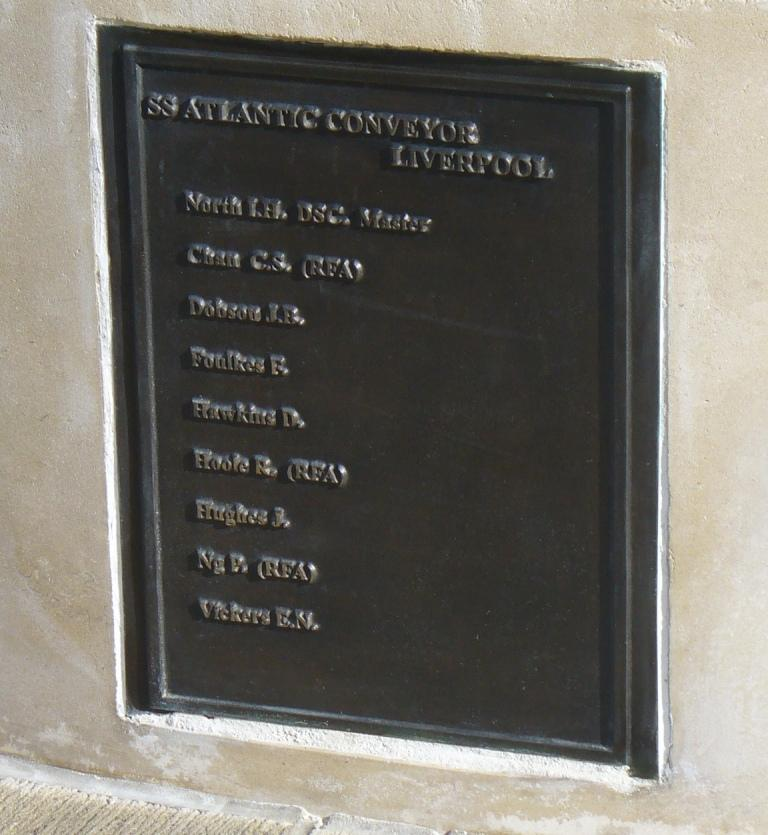
Atlantic Conveyor plaque at the Tower Hill Memorial Trinity Square Gardens, Tower Hill, London

The vessel carried a Merchant Navy crew of 33. This included 12 officers (master, chief officer, second officer, third officer, radio officer, chief engineer, second engineer, two third engineers, fourth engineer, electrician and purser), 10 petty officers (bosun, four mechanics, two first cooks, second cook/baker, second cook and second steward) and 11 ratings (five seamen, three greasers and three assistant stewards). Of the 12 men killed in the sinking of Atlantic Conveyor six were from the Merchant Navy, three were from the Royal Fleet Auxiliary and three were from the Royal Navy.

The ship's master, Captain Ian Harry North, who disappeared while trying to swim to a life raft, was posthumously awarded the Distinguished Service Cross (DSC). As the last resting place of the remains of those who died, the wreck is designated as a protected place under the Protection of Military Remains Act 1986. The officers' bar on M/V Atlantic Conveyor, built 1984 in Swan Hunter, Wallsend is named "The North Bar" after Captain Ian North. The ship's replacement was built on Tyneside.
