= Augusto Bedacarratz =

Argentinian aviator

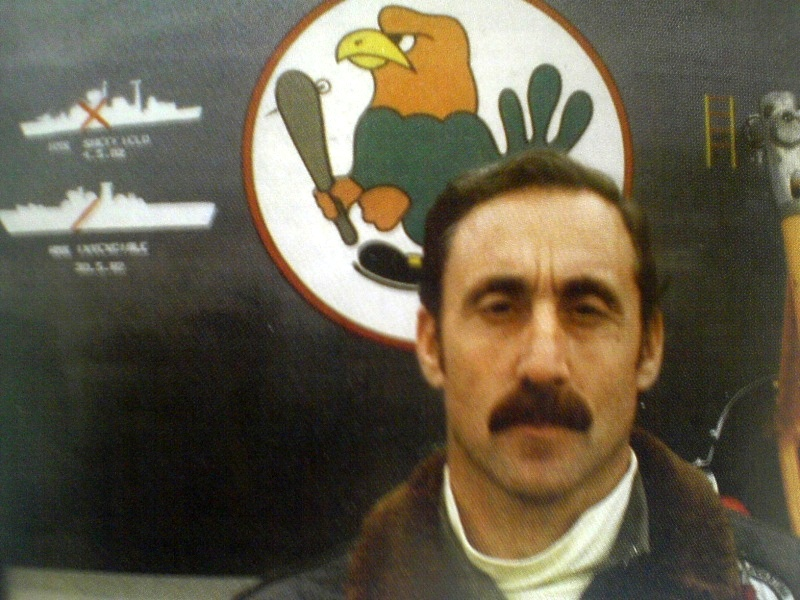
- Bedacarratz in front of two symbols, representing attacks on Royal Navy ships, on his aircraft
- Born: Augusto Bedacarratz; July 9, 1943 (age 82); Argentina
- Allegiance: Argentina
- Branch: Argentine Navy
- Service years: 1965–1991
- Rank: Capitán de Navío
- Conflicts: Falklands War; Sinking of HMS Sheffield
- Awards: El Honorable Congreso de la Nación a los Combatientes

Frigate Captain Augusto Bedacarratz is a former Argentinian naval aviator who led the mission on 4 May 1982 that sank HMS Sheffield during the Falklands War using the Exocet AM.39 anti-ship missile. It was the first sinking of a Royal Navy ship in four decades.

== Early life ==
He was born in Villa Maza, but moved to Macachín, La Pampa Province when he was a child. He lived and studied there until secondary school, . Then he moved to the Buenos Aires province where he attended high-school at Euskal-Echea college in Llavallol. Currently, he lives there but visits Macachín frequently because he has a country farm and friends there. The airclub of Macachín was called "Augusto Bedacarratz" in honor of him.

== Career ==
He joined the Argentine Naval Academy, graduating first in his class in 1965.

=== Attack on HMS Sheffield ===
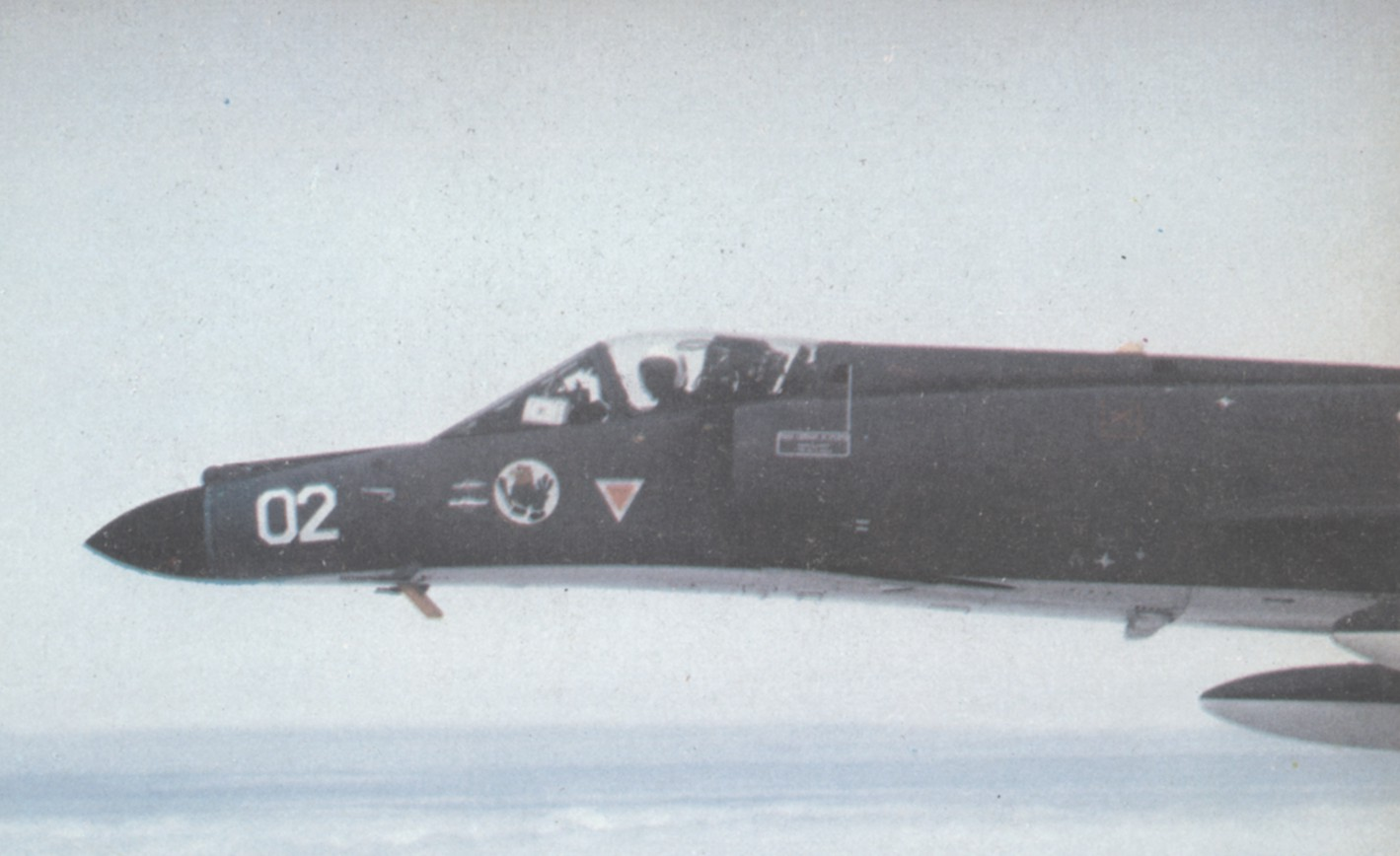
His Etendard aircraft, 3-A-202

On 4 May 1982, an Argentine scout plane located Sheffield. Bedacarratz and Lieutenant Armando Mayora were the two pilots on duty in the Search and Attack Naval Squadron, and were ordered to take off. Neither pilot had fired an Exocet missile before. The two Super Etendard planes detected Sheffield, out of sight, from 20 miles away. Four seconds after Bedacarratz pressed the release button, the Exocet left his aircraft. Lieutenant Mayora, after seeing the Exocet launch, fired his own Exocet.

Afterward, both aircraft turned home for their base, but flew at 15 metres above the sea in the direction of the Antarctic to confuse the Royal Navy. Sheffield was with HMS Coventry and HMS Glasgow. The two approaching aircraft had been picked up by Glasgow; Sheffield was twenty miles away at the time and its operations room was not fully staffed so that not everything Glasgow sent was received by Sheffield. At the time, Sheffield was sending a message back to Britain via satellite, meaning that it could not see anything on its radar. There were 281 on board, and 20 sailors were killed, with 26 injured.

Bedacarratz retired from the Argentine Navy in 1991, with over 3,500 military flying hours and 200 carrier landings.

== Personal life ==
He has two daughters, a son and three granddaughters.
