= Peter Harrison Planetarium =

Planetarium in Greenwich

Coordinates: 51.4771°N 0.0008°W

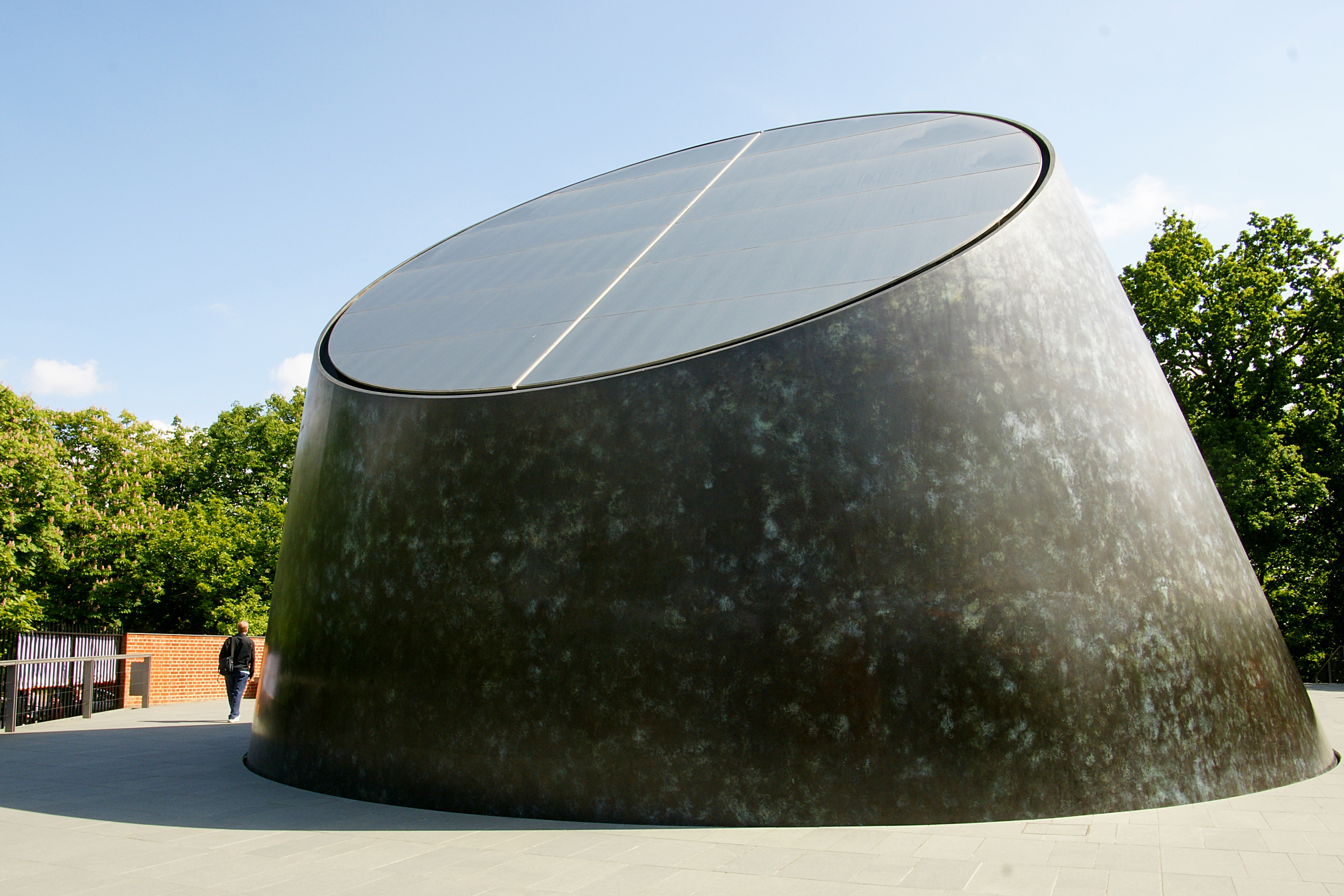
Peter Harrison Planetarium viewed from roughly north west

The Peter Harrison Planetarium is a 120-seat digital laser planetarium, situated in Greenwich Park, London and is part of the National Maritime Museum. It opened on 25 May 2007, funded by the philanthropist Peter Harrison.

The planetarium uses Digistar 3 software with blue, red and green lasers and grating light valve (GLV) technology to create a 4,000 pixel strip. This strip is swept to produce a 5,000 by 4,000 pixel image, refreshed 60 times per second. The image is projected through a fisheye lens onto the dome of the planetarium.

This planetarium is housed inside a 45-ton bronze-clad truncated cone, with the south side tilted at 51.5^{o} to the horizontal (the latitude of Greenwich), the north side pointing at the local Zenith (i.e. at 90 degrees to the local horizon) and the top being slanted to be parallel to the celestial equator. The construction stands parallel to (but 50 metres east of) the prime meridian. It was conceived under the then Director, Roy Clare CBE, as the centrepiece of the "Time and Space" project, a £17.7m re-development of the Royal Observatory, Greenwich, and funded with a £3.25m grant from the Peter Harrison Foundation.

== See also ==
- London Planetarium
