= Flottille 17F =

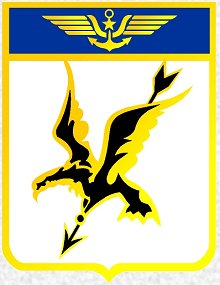
- Active: 17 April 1958 - 1962; 10 January 1964 -present
- Country: France
- Branch: French Naval Aviation
- Garrison/HQ: Landivisiau Naval Air Base

Aircraft flown
- Fighter: Dassault Rafale M F3-R

Flottille 17F is a squadron of French Naval Aviation which currently flies the Dassault Rafale M from Landivisiau Naval Air Base. It was formed during April 1958 at Hyeres Naval Air Base and flew the Vought F4U-7 Corsair for training purposes.

Flottille 17F is nicknamed "La glorieuse". The symbol of the 17F flotilla is the osprey.

== History ==
It quickly proved itself in the Algerian theater of operations and Tunisia.

The squadron was dissolved in 1962, but later reformed on 10 January 1964 using the Dassault Etendard IV M with the Super Etendard entering service on 5 September 1980, 17F was the first flotilla to use the Super Étendard Modernisé.

The Super Etendard aircraft composing the Flottille 17F regularly embarked aboard the French nuclear aircraft-carrier Charles de Gaulle.

Flottille 17F was involved in many conflicts such as:

- Mission Olifant in 1983 in Lebanon;
- Mission Prometheus for 14 months in the Gulf of Oman;
- Mission Capselle off the coast of Lebanon in August 1989;
- Opération Daguet during the Gulf War.
- Former Yugoslavia aboard Clemenceau and Foch between 1993 and 1996
- Afghanistan (Mission Héraclès, Operation Agapanthe, Operation Anaconda) aboard Charles de Gaulle from 2001 from the Indian Ocean
- Libya (Opération Harmattan) aboard Charles de Gaulle during 2011.

Flotilla 17F was the last French unit to use the Super Etendard Modernisé aircraft which was retired on 12 July 2016.

== Present day ==
The unit currently flies the Dassault Rafale M F3-R.

== Aircraft operated ==
- Vought F4U Corsair – April 1958 to April 1962
- Dassault Étendard IVM – June 1964 to June 1980
- Dassault-Breguet Super Étendard – September 1980 to July 2016
- Dassault Rafale – September 2016 to date
