= Peter Harrison (philanthropist) =

British businessman and philanthropist

Sir Peter Robert Harrison KGCN CBE (29 April 1937 – 18 June 2021) was a British business man notable as a philanthropist.

== Early life ==
Born in 1937, Harrison was the son of Dolly Harrison, a seamstress, and Bob Harrison, a bus driver in Manchester who a few years later was one of the British soldiers evacuated from Dunkirk. He grew up in Cheadle, Cheshire, and was educated at Broadway County Secondary School and Stockport Technical College, playing for the college in both soccer and cricket. While at school, he learned to sail on the Norfolk Broads. He left school at the age of sixteen with eight O-Levels, then trained as a chartered accountant, qualifying at the age of 21.

== Business career ==
Harrison worked as an executive for the Ford Motor Company, Firth Cleveland, and Crest Nicholson, which bought a company called Chernikeeff, a maker of marine instruments. In 1978, he borrowed the money to buy out this business, seeing that its instrument technology would become important in communications. The company developed Telex messaging and later became the British distributor of the internet routers of Cisco Systems. In 1999, he sold Chernikeeff for £300 million.

== Sportsman ==
As a young man in Cheadle, Harrison played football, then at the age of thirty three he moved to Reigate and joined the Old Reigatian Rugby Football Club, playing as a wing and as a prop forward into his fifties. A supporter of Chelsea F.C., he became one of its vice-presidents.

Taking up the sport of yachting, Harrison won races at the Cowes Regatta and in the West Indies, sailed across the Atlantic Ocean many times in his Farr 115 35-metre racing yacht Sojana, and in 2002/2003 led the British challenge for the America's Cup, in New Zealand.

== Philanthropy ==
Harrison established the Peter Harrison Foundation, which by 2021 had given away over £50 million. Its focus is on sport for people with disabilities, care for children with special needs, and the education of children from disadvantaged backgrounds.

Harrison sponsored Paralympic athletes through the British Paralympic Association and SportsAid. He funded the Peter Harrison Centre for Disability Sport at Loughborough University, paid for the Peter Harrison Planetarium at Greenwich, and founded bursaries at Reigate Grammar School for children with academic ability. In 2018, the Peter Harrison Foundation gave the school £4 million to build a new Sixth form centre. He also gave some £5 million to develop new rugby pitches and to build a new clubhouse for the Old Reigatian RFC.

In 2012, Harrison and the Peter Harrison Foundation created the Peter Harrison Heritage Foundation with an initial endowment of £7 million. This gives grants particularly in the areas of military and naval history and has supported projects of the Imperial War Museum, the National Army Museum, the Mary Rose Museum, the Bletchley Park Trust, the Fly Navy Heritage Trust, the Hougoumont Farmhouse on the field of the Battle of Waterloo, and Clarence House, Antigua.

== Personal life ==
In 1962, Harrison married Joyce E. Kirby. They had a son and a daughter and later three grandchildren.

He died at home in Reigate on 18 June 2021.

== Honours ==
- 2005: Honorary Doctor of Technology of the University of Loughborough
- 2010 Birthday Honours: Commander of the Order of the British Empire, for charitable services
- 2013: Knight Grand Cross of the Order of the Nation (Antigua and Barbuda)
