= Dassault-Breguet Super Étendard =

Attack aircraft by Dassault

Super Étendard
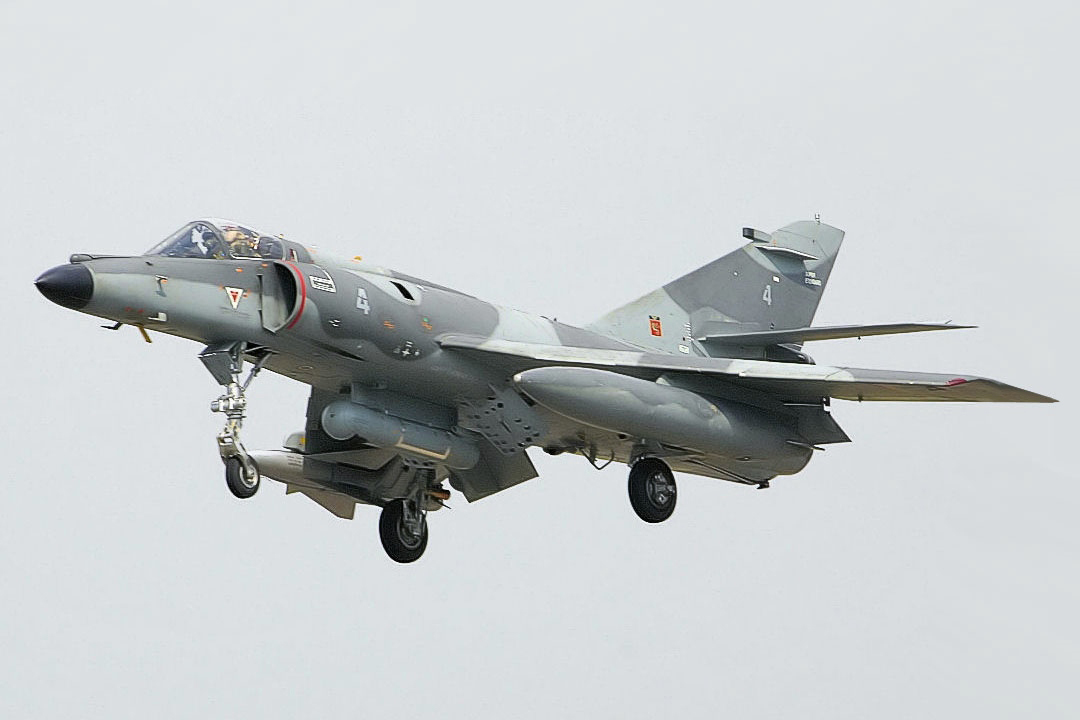
- A Super Étendard at RIAT in 2005.

General information
- Type: Strike aircraft
- National origin: France
- Manufacturer: Dassault-Breguet
- Primary users: French Naval Aviation (historical) Argentine Naval Aviation (historical); Iraqi Air Force (historical)
- Number built: 85

History
- Manufactured: 1974–1983
- Introduction date: June 1978
- First flight: 28 October 1974
- Retired: July 2016 (French Navy)
- Developed from: Dassault Étendard IV

The Dassault-Breguet Super Étendard (Étendard is French for "battle flag", cognate to English "standard") is a French retired carrier-borne strike fighter aircraft designed and produced by the French aircraft manufacturer Dassault-Breguet. It was primarily used by the French Navy, and was also operated by Iraq (on a temporary lease) and Argentina.

The Super Étendard was developed during the 1970s after French officials decided against procuring a navalised version of the SEPECAT Jaguar. It drew heavily upon the Étendard IVM, being equipped with a more powerful engine as well as a new wing and improved avionics drawn from Dassault's other aircraft. The Super Étendard performed its maiden flight in October 1974 and entered service with the French Navy in June 1978. In French service, the type saw use during several conflicts including the Kosovo war, the war in Afghanistan and the military intervention in Libya.

Both Iraqi and Argentinian Super Étendard saw active combat during their service life. The Argentinian Navy made use of both the Super Étendard and the Exocet anti-ship missile during the 1982 Falklands War, which led to the aircraft gaining considerable recognition with the general public. The Super Étendard was used by Iraq to attack oil tankers and merchant shipping in the Persian Gulf during the Iraq-Iran War. The French Navy opted to withdraw the last of its Super Étendards during 2016 in favour of the newer Dassault Rafale. The final operator of the type was the Argentinian Navy, which opted to retire its Super Étendards in 2023.

== Development ==
The Super Étendard is a development of the earlier Étendard IVM which had been developed in the 1950s. The Étendard IVM was originally to have been replaced by a navalised version of the SEPECAT Jaguar, designated as the Jaguar M; however the Jaguar M project was stalled by a combination of political problems and issues experienced during trial deployments on board carriers. Specifically, the Jaguar M had suffered handling problems when being flown on a single engine and a poor throttle response time that made landing back on a carrier after an engine failure difficult. In 1973, all development work on the Jaguar M was formally cancelled by the French government.

There were several proposed aircraft to replace the Jaguar M, including the LTV A-7 Corsair II and the Douglas A-4 Skyhawk. Dassault exerted its political influence with the French government and produced its own proposal to meet the requirement. According to Bill Gunston and Peter Gilchrist, Dassault had played a significant role in the cancellation of the Jaguar M with the aim of creating a vacancy for their own proposal – the Super Étendard. The Super Étendard was essentially an improved version of the existing Étendard IVM, outfitted with a more powerful engine, a new wing and improved avionics. Dassault sold its plane as the only fully French-made candidate, and as cheaper than the other contestants, using modern technology already proven in existing Dassault planes. Dassault's Super Étendard proposal was accepted by the French Navy in 1973, leading to a series of prototypes being quickly assembled.

The first of three prototypes to be built, an Étendard IVM which had been modified with the new engine and some of the new avionics, made its maiden flight on 28 October 1974. The original intention of the French Navy was to order a total of 100 Super Étendards, however the order placed was for 60 of the new model with options for a further 20; further budget cuts and an escalation in the aircraft's per unit price eventually led to only 71 Super Étendards being purchased. Dassault began making deliveries of the type to the French Navy in June 1978.

In the first year of production, 15 Super Étendards were produced for the French Navy, allowing the formation of the first squadron in 1979. Dassault produced the aircraft at a rough rate of two per month.

The Argentine Navy was the only export customer. Argentina placed an order for 14 aircraft to meet their requirements for a capable new fighter that could operate from their sole aircraft carrier. In 1983, all manufacturing activity was completed, the last delivery to the French Navy taking place that year.

== Design ==
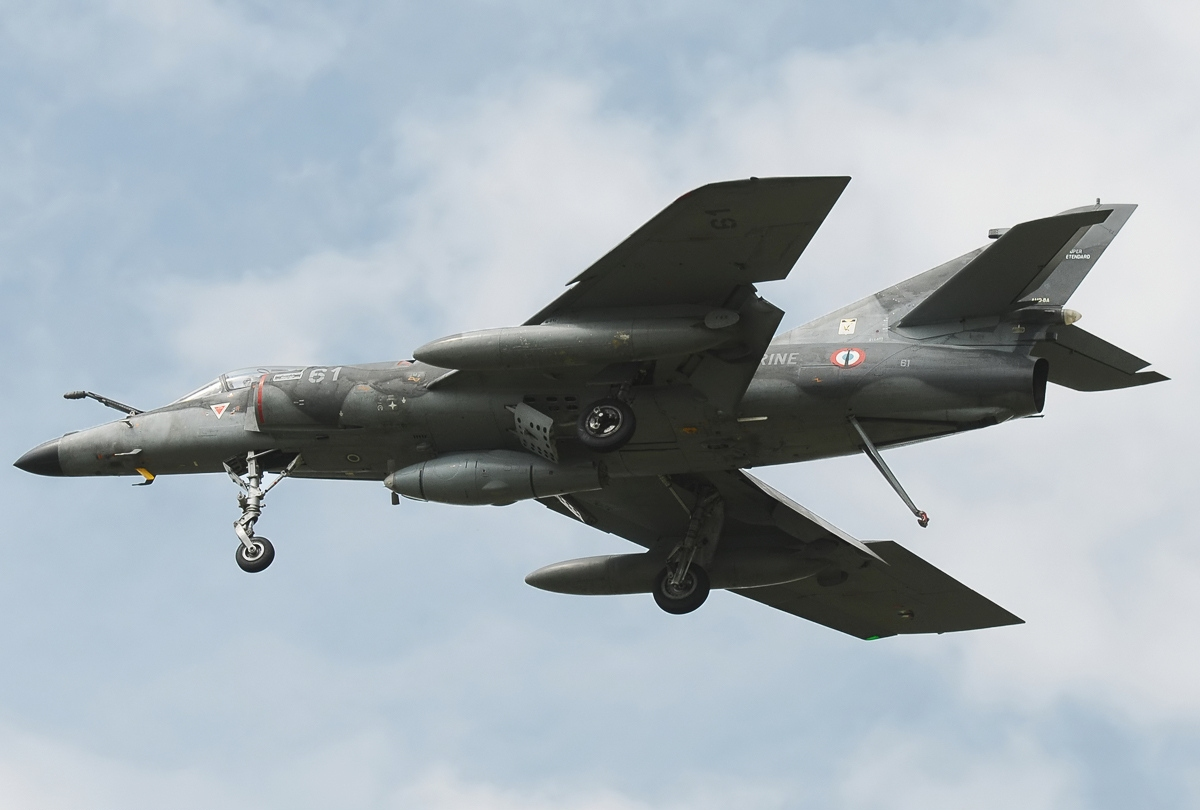
Underside of a Super Étendard in-flight. The protruding tail hook is towards the rear of the fuselage

The Super Étendard used the airframe of the Étendard IV and as such was a small, single-engined, mid-winged aircraft with an all-metal structure. Both the wings and tailplane are swept, with the folding wings having a sweepback of about 45 degrees, while the aircraft is powered by a non-afterburning SNECMA Atar 8K-50 turbojet with a rating of 49 kN (11,025 lbf). Its performance was not much better than the Étendard IV, but its avionics were significantly improved.

The main new weapon of the Super Étendard was the French anti-shipping missile, the Aérospatiale AM 39 Exocet. The aircraft had a Thomson-CSF Agave radar, an updated version of the Cyrano IV used on the Dassault Mirage F1, which, amongst other functions, was essential to launch the Exocet missile. One of the major technical advances of the Super Étendard was its onboard UAT-40 central computer; this managed most mission-critical systems, integrating navigational data and functions, radar information and display, and weapons targeting and controls.

In the 1990s, significant modifications and upgrades were made to the type, including an updated UAT-90 computer and a new Thomson-CSF Anemone radar which provided nearly double the range of the previous Agave radar. Other upgrades at this time included an extensively redesigned cockpit with HOTAS controls, and airframe life-extension work was undertaken; a total of 48 aircraft received these upgrades, at a rate of 15 per year. During the 2000s, further improvements included significantly improved self-defence ECM capability to better evade enemy detection and attacks, cockpit compatibility with night vision goggles, a new inertial data system partly integrating GPS, and compatibility with the Damocles Laser designator pod.

The Super Étendard could also deploy tactical nuclear weapons; initially these were unguided gravity bombs only, however, during the 1990s the Super Étendard was extensively upgraded, enabling the deployment of the Air-Sol Moyenne Portée, a ramjet-powered air-launched nuclear missile. The aircraft was also refitted with the ability to operate a range of laser-guided bombs and, to enable the type to replace the retiring Étendard IV in the reconnaissance mission, the Super Étendard was fitted to carry a specialist reconnaissance pod as well. However, the aircraft is unable to perform naval landings without jettisoning unexpended ordnance.

== Operational history ==
=== Argentina ===
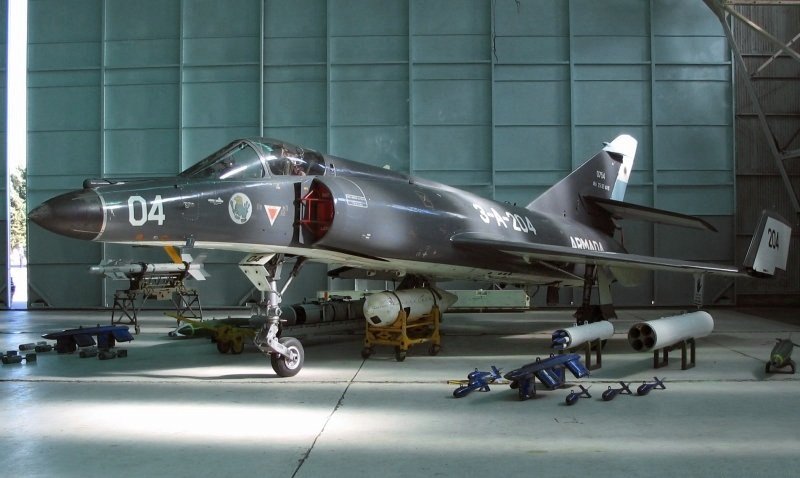
During the 1982 Falklands War, the Argentine Super Étendards were used as a launch platform for Exocet anti-ship missiles

The Argentine Naval Aviation decided to buy 14 Super Étendards in 1979 after the United States put an arms embargo in place, due to the Dirty War and refused to supply spare parts for Argentina's fleet of A-4Q Skyhawks. Between August and November 1981, five Super Étendards and five anti-ship sea-skimming Exocet missiles were shipped to Argentina. The Super Étendards, armed with Exocet anti-ship missiles played a key role in the Falklands War between Argentina and the United Kingdom in 1982. The 2nd Naval Squadron was stationed at the Río Grande, Tierra del Fuego naval air base; during the conflict. The threat posed to British naval forces led to the planning of Operation Mikado and other proposed infiltration missions to raid the airbase, aiming to destroy the Super Étendards to prevent their use. A total of four Super Étendards were operational during the conflict.

A first attempt to attack the British fleet was made on 2 May 1982, but this was abandoned due to in-flight-refuelling problems. On 4 May, two Super Étendards, guided by a Lockheed P-2H Neptune, each launched one Exocet at the British destroyer HMS Sheffield, with one missile crippling Sheffield. On 25 May, another attack by two Super Étendards resulted in two missiles hitting the merchant ship Atlantic Conveyor, which was carrying several helicopters and other supplies to the front line. The Exocets that struck Atlantic Conveyor had been inadvertently redirected by decoy chaff deployed as a defensive measure by other ships; Both Sheffield and Atlantic Conveyor sank whilst under tow some days later following these Exocet strikes.

On May 30 two Super Étendards, one carrying Argentina's last remaining Exocet, escorted by four A-4C Skyhawks each with 3 500lb bombs, took off to attack the carrier HMS Invincible.

Following the end of the conflict, by 1984 Argentina had received all the 14 Super Étendards ordered, and Exocets with which to arm them. Super Étendards performed qualifications on the aircraft carrier ARA 25 de Mayo until the ship's final retirement. Since 1993, Argentine pilots have practised on board the neighbouring Brazilian Navy's aircraft carrier São Paulo. Touch-and-go landing exercises were also common on US Navy carriers during Gringo-Gaucho manoeuvres and joint exercises.

In 2009, an agreement was signed between Argentina and France to upgrade Argentina's remaining fleet of Super Étendards. An earlier proposal to acquire former French Naval Super Étendards was rejected due to high levels of accumulated flight hours; instead equipment and hardware would be removed from retiring French airframes and installed into Argentine aircraft, effectively upgrading them to the Super Étendard Modernisé (SEM) standard. By March 2014, while the Argentine Navy continued to seek the upgrade kits for 10 of its 11 remaining Super Étendards; this ambition appears to have been complicated by several factors, France has been non-committal regarding the sought sale; critically, political developments between France and the UK may potentially allow the UK to obstruct the supply of military equipment to Argentina such as the upgrade kits and the Exocet missile.

During 2017, five Super Étendard Modernisé were purchased from France to bolster the fleet at a cost of €12.5 million, along with a simulator, eight spare engines, and a large batch of spares and tooling. However, while these aircraft were delivered in 2019, in 2020 they were still awaiting the delivery of key spare parts and it was announced that they may not be in operational service for a further two years. In 2021, it was reported that the aircraft also remained non-operational due to problems obtaining components for the Martin Baker ejection seats manufactured in the U.K.. As a result, alternative parts were being sought in the United States. In early 2022, it was reported that the spare parts problem remained unresolved and the aircraft remained in storage. On 17 May 2023, on the occasion of the 209th anniversary of the Argentine Navy, Argentinean Minister of Defense Jorge Taiana, announced the withdrawal from service of all the Super Étendards of the Aviación Naval Argentina.

=== France ===
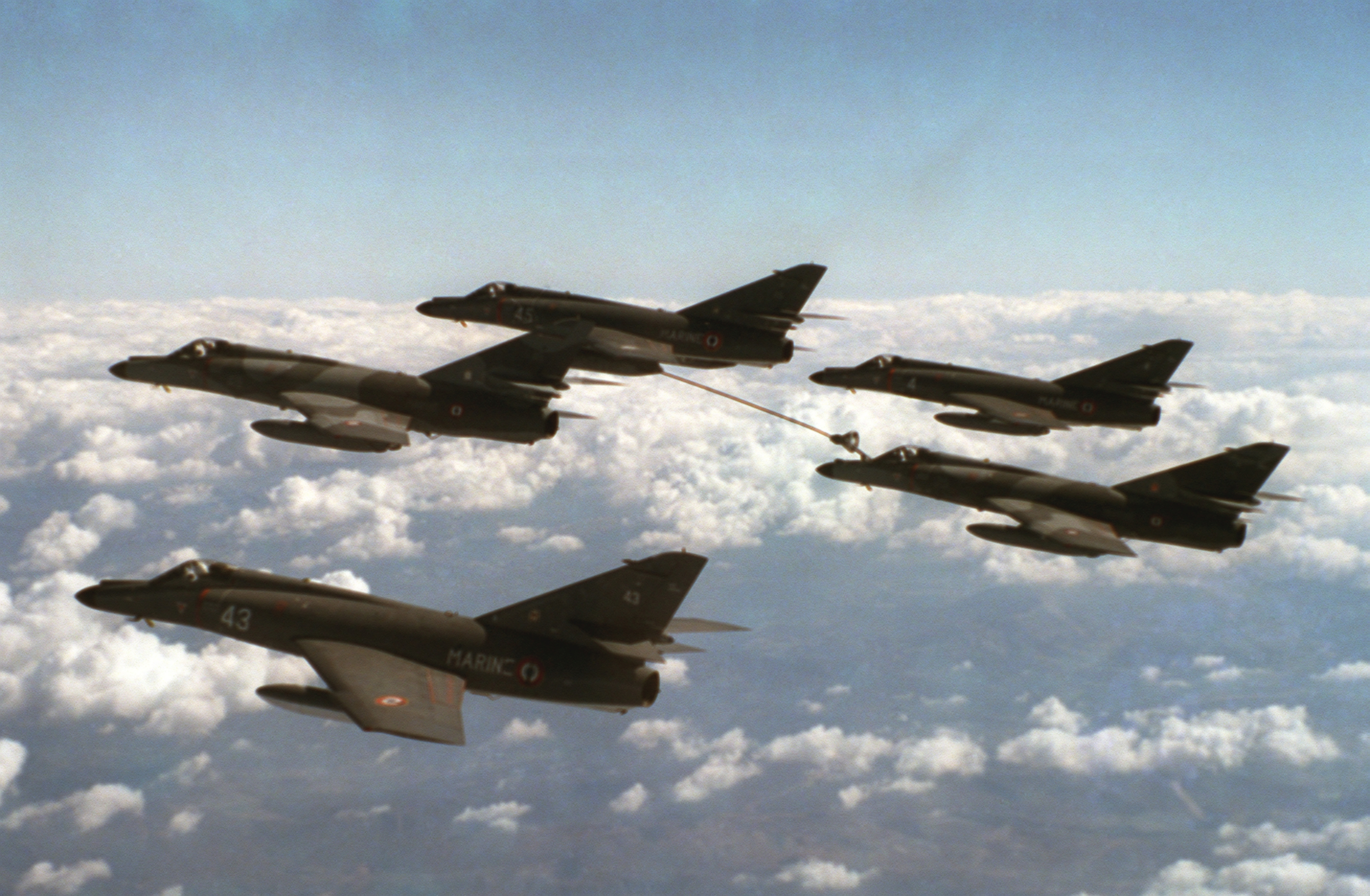
A formation of Super Étendards in flight, one of which is refueling another Super Étendard, through "buddy-to-buddy" refueling process.

Deliveries of the Super Étendard to the French Navy started in 1978, with the first squadron, Flottille 11F becoming operational in February 1979. As they offered no air combat capabilities France had to extend useful life of its Crusaders fighters, as no replacement option was found.

In total, three operational squadrons and a training unit were equipped with the Super Étendard. The Super Étendards would operate from both of France's aircraft carriers at that time, Clemenceau and Foch; either carrier's air wing typically comprised 16 Super Étendards, 10 F-8 Crusaders, 3 Étendard IVPs, 7 Breguet Alizé anti-submarine aircraft, as well as numerous helicopters.

The first fighting operational missions took place in Lebanon during Operation Olifant. On 22 September 1983, French Navy Super Étendards operating from Foch bombed and destroyed Syrian forces positions after a few artillery rounds were fired at the French peace keepers. On November 10, a Super Étendard dodged a Syrian SA-7 shoulder-launched missile near Bourj el-Barajneh while flying over Druze positions. On 17 November 1983, the same airplanes attacked and destroyed an Islamic Amal training camp in Baalbeck after a terrorist attack on French paratroopers in Beirut.

From 1991, the original pure attack Étendard IVMs were withdrawn from French service; though the reconnaissance version of the Étendard IV, the IVP, remained in service until July 2000. In response, the Super Étendards underwent a series of upgrades throughout the 1990s to add new capabilities and update existing systems for use in the modern battlefield. Designated Super Étendard Modernisé (SEM), the first combat missions for the type came during NATO's Allied Force operations over Serbia in 1999 flying 400 combat missions. An Étendard IVPM from the Flottile 16.F was hit by a Serb SAM on 15 April 1994, while flying a reconnaissance mission over Gorazde, Bosnia, as part of Operation Deny Flight. The pilot managed to safely land on Clemenceau despite heavy damage on its tailpipe, elevators and fin.

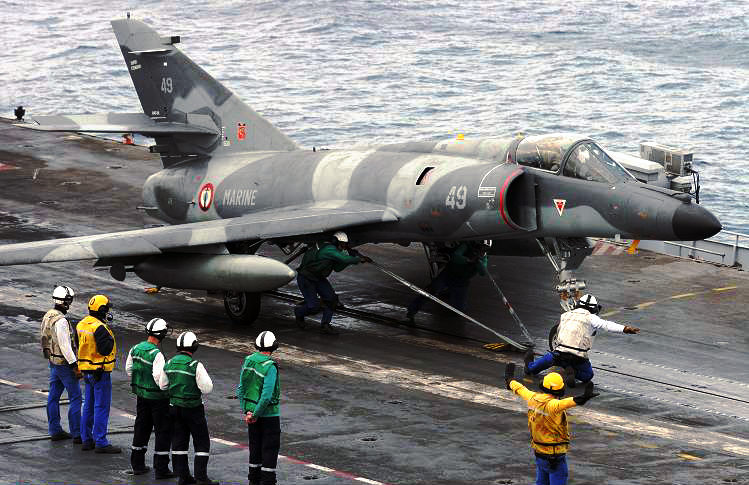
Launch from Charles de Gaulle

The SEM also flew strike missions in Operation Enduring Freedom. Mission Héraclès starting 21 November 2001 saw the deployment of the aircraft carrier Charles de Gaulle and its Super Étendards in Afghanistan. Operation Anaconda, starting on 2 March 2002 saw extensive use of the Super Étendard in support of French and allied ground troops. Super Étendards returned to operations over Afghanistan in 2004, 2006, 2007, 2008 and 2010–2011. One of their main roles was to carry laser designation pods to illuminate targets for Dassault Rafales.

In March 2011, Étendards were deployed as a part of Task Force 473, during France's Opération Harmattan in support of UN resolution 1973 during the Libyan conflict. They were paired again with Dassault Rafales on interdiction missions. The final Super Étendards in French naval aviation were in one "flottille" (squadron) called flottille 17F. All Super Étendards were retired from French service on 12 July 2016 to be replaced by the Dassault Rafale M, 42 years after the subsonic attack jet performed its first flight. The Super Étendard's last operational deployment from Charles de Gaulle was in support of Opération Chammal against Islamic State militants in Iraq and Syria, which began in late 2015. On 16 March 2016, the aircraft undertook its final launch from Charles de Gaulle ahead of its final withdrawal from service in July.

=== Iraq ===
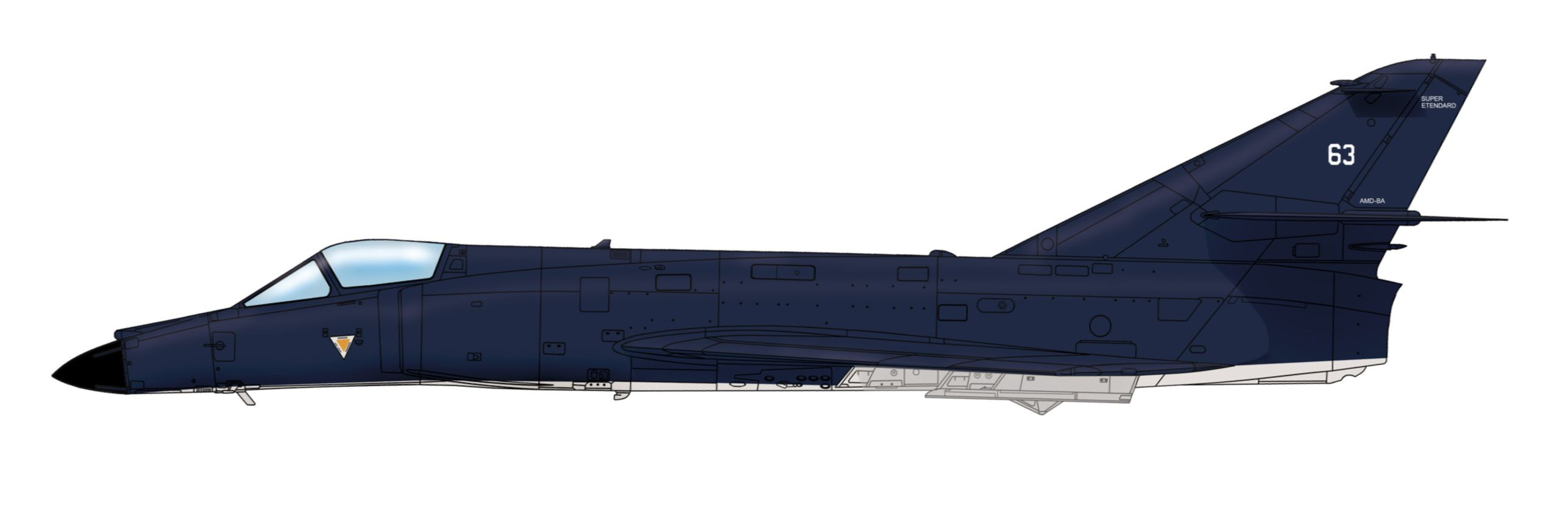
Iraqi Air Force Super Étendard, circa 1983

A total of five Super Étendards were loaned to Iraq in 1983 while the country was waiting for deliveries of Dassault Mirage F1EQ capable of launching Exocet missiles that had been ordered; the first of these aircraft arrived in Iraq on 8 October 1983. The provision of Super Étendards to Iraq was politically controversial, the United States and Iraq's neighbour Iran were vocal in their opposition while Saudi Arabia supported the loan; the aircraft were seen as an influential factor in the 1980–88 Iraq-Iran War as they could launch Exocet strikes on Iranian merchant shipping traversing the Persian Gulf. The Super Étendards began maritime operations over Persian Gulf in March 1984; a total of 34 attacks were carried out on Iranian shipping through the rest of 1984. Tankers of any nationality that were carrying Iranian crude oil were also subject to Iraqi attacks.

Iraq typically deployed the Super Étendards in pairs, escorted by Mirage F1EQ fighters from bases in Southern Iraq; once inside the mission zone, the Super Étendards would search for targets using their onboard radar and engage suspected tankers at long range without visual identification. While tankers would typically be struck by a launched Exocet, they were often only lightly damaged. On 2 April 1984, an Iraqi Super Étendard was reportedly shot down by a AIM-7E-2 missile fired by an Iranian F-4E Phantom II piloted by Khosrow Adibi over Kharg Island. Separately, on 26 July and 7 August 1984, claims of Super Étendard losses to Iranian Grumman F-14A Tomcats were reported. Iran claimed a total of three Super Étendards to have been shot down by Iranian interceptors; France stated that four of the five leased aircraft were returned to France in 1985.

== Operators ==
=== Former operators ===
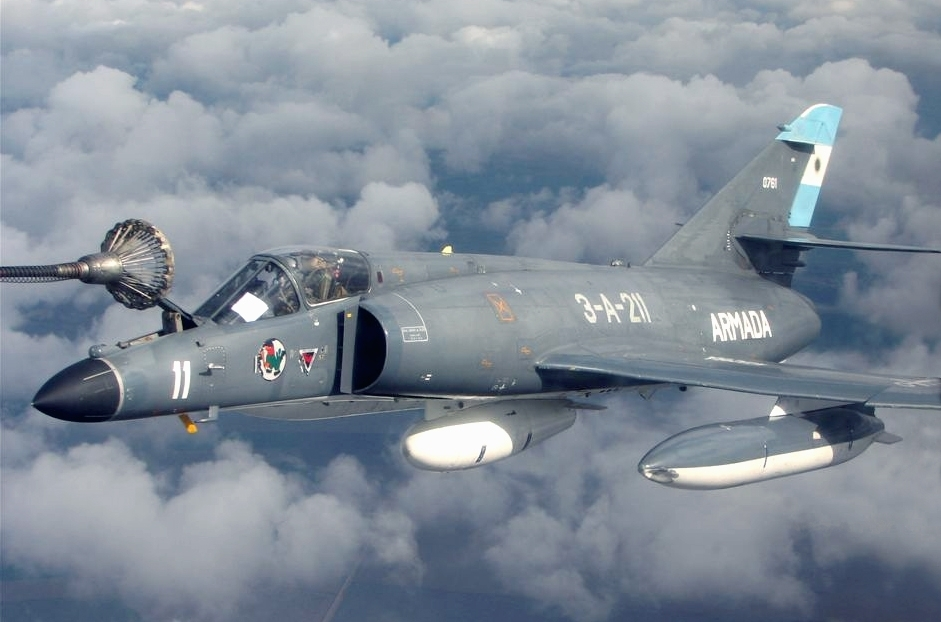
Argentine Navy's Super Étendard

Argentina

November 1981 - May 2023

- 19

- 2da Escuadrilla Aeronaval de Caza y Ataque (Note: The Argentine Navy originally received 14 aircraft, of which few are currently operational. A further 5 ex-French navy aircraft (Modernisé spec) were acquired for operational service and training/spare parts in 2017; these aircraft remain non-operational as of 2021. On 17 May 2023, the final withdrawal from service of all the Super Étendards of the Aviación Naval Argentina was announced.)

France

June 1978 - July 2016

- 71

- Flottille 11F
- Flottille 14F
- Flottille 17F
- Escadrille 59S

Iraq

October 1983 - 1985

- 5 (Note: The Iraqi Air Force was loaned five French aircraft between 1983 and 1985; one was lost during the Iran–Iraq War, the remainder returned to France in 1985.)

== Specifications ==
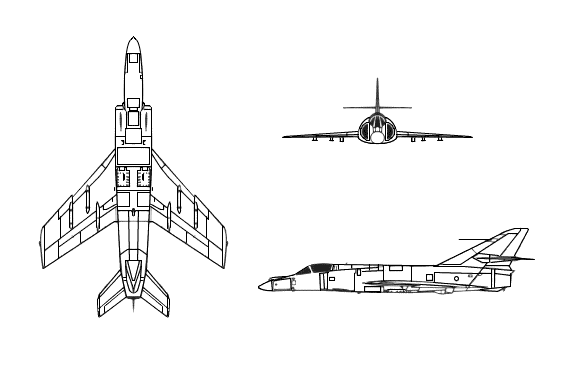
Orthographically projected diagram of the Dassault-Breguet Super Étendard

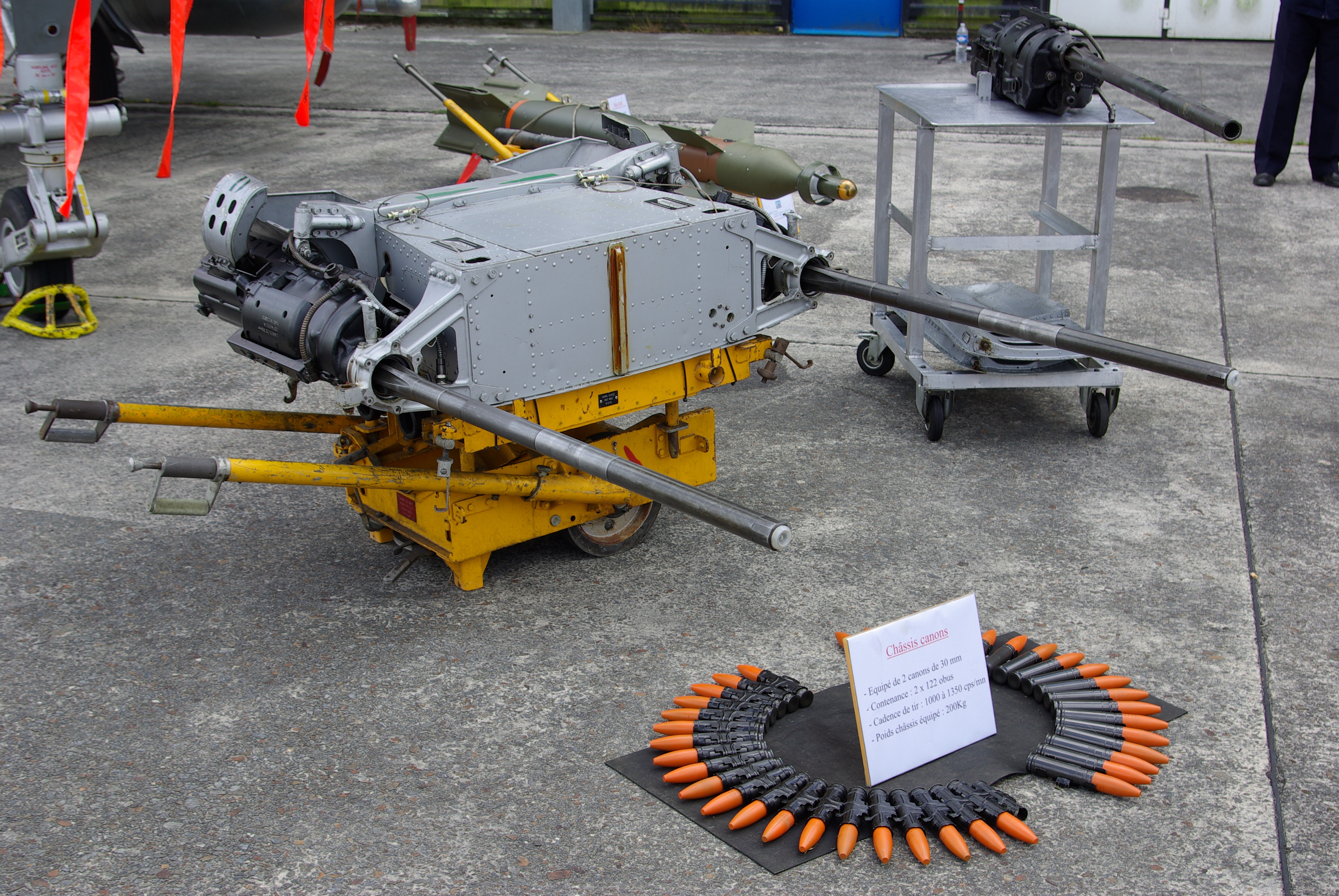
DEFA 552 cannons on display

Data from All The World's Aircraft 1982–83;

General characteristics

- Crew: 1
- Length: 14.31 m (46 ft 11 in)
- Wingspan: 9.6 m (31 ft 6 in)
- Height: 3.86 m (12 ft 8 in)
- Wing area: 28.4 m^{2} (306 sq ft)
- Empty weight: 6,500 kg (14,330 lb)
- Max takeoff weight: 12,000 kg (26,455 lb)
- Powerplant: 1 × Snecma Atar 8K-50 turbojet, 49 kN (11,000 lbf) thrust

Performance

- Maximum speed: 1,205 km/h (749 mph, 651 kn)
- Range: 1,820 km (1,130 mi, 980 nmi)
- Combat range: 850 km (530 mi, 460 nmi) with one AM39 Exocet missile on one wing pylon and one drop tank on opposite pylon, hi-lo-hi profile
- Service ceiling: 13,700 m (44,900 ft)
- Rate of climb: 100 m/s (20,000 ft/min)
- Wing loading: 423 kg/m^{2} (87 lb/sq ft)
- Thrust/weight: 0.77 (Empty), 0.42 (MTOW)

Armament

- Guns: 2× 30 mm (1.18 in) DEFA 552 cannons with 125 rounds per gun
- Hardpoints: 4× underwing and 2× under-fuselage with a capacity of 2,100 kg (4,600 lb) maximum
- Rockets: 4× Matra rocket pods with 18× SNEB 68 mm rockets each
- Missiles:
  - 1× AM-39 Exocet Anti-shipping missile or
  - 1× Air-Sol Moyenne Portée nuclear armed missile or
  - 2× AS-30L or
  - 2× Matra Magic Air-to-air missile
- Bombs: Conventional unguided or laser-guided bombs, provision for 1 × AN-52 free-fall nuclear bomb, provision for "buddy" air refuelling pod

== See also ==
Related development

- Dassault Étendard II
- Dassault Étendard IV
- Dassault Étendard VI

Aircraft of comparable role, configuration, and era

- Douglas A-4 Skyhawk
- LTV A-7 Corsair II
- Blackburn Buccaneer

Related lists

- Iranian aerial victories during the Iran-Iraq war
- List of attack aircraft
- List of military aircraft of France

Current squadrons

- Flottille 17F
- 2da Escuadrilla Aeronaval de Caza y Ataque

== Sources ==
- Burden, Rodney A.; Draper, Michael A.; Rough, Douglas A.; Smith, Colin A.; Wilton, David (1986). Falklands: The Air War. Twickenham, UK: British Air Review Group. ISBN 0-906339-05-7.
- Carbonel, Jean-Christophe (2016). French Secret Projects 1: Post War Fighters. Manchester, UK: Crecy Publishing. ISBN 978-1-91080-900-6.
- Cooper, Tom (2004). Iranian F-14 Tomcat Units in Combat. Osprey Publishing. ISBN 1-841767-87-5.
- Donald, David; Lake, Jon, eds. (1996). Encyclopedia of World Military Aircraft (Single volume ed.). London: Aerospace Publishing. ISBN 1-874023-95-6.
- Freedman, Lawrence (2005). The Official History of the Falklands Campaign: The 1982 Falklands War and Its Aftermath. Routledge. ISBN 0-714652-07-5.
- Friedman, Norman (2006). The Naval Institute Guide to World Naval Weapon Systems (5th ed.). Naval Institute Press. ISBN 1-557502-62-5.
- Grolleau, Henri-Paul (January 2008). "The Aéronavale Spearhead". Air International. Vol. 64, no. 1. Stamford, UK. pp. 38–43. ISSN 0306-5634.
- Gunston, Bill; Gilchrist, Peter (1993). Jet Bombers: From the Messerschmitt Me 262 to the Stealth B-2. Osprey. ISBN 1-85532-258-7.
- Hoyle, Craig (13–19 December 2011). "World Air Forces Directory". Flight International. pp. 26–52.
- Huertas, Salvador Mafé (1997). "Super Étendard in the Falklands: 2ª Escuadrilla Aeronaval de Caza y Ataque". Wings of Fame. Vol. 8. London: Aerospace Publishing. ISBN 1-86184-008-X.
- Jackson, Paul (February 1986), "France's Superior Standard", Air International, vol. 30, no. 2, Bromley, UK: Fine Scroll, pp. 49–69, ISSN 0306-5634.
- ——— (Winter 1992), "SEPECAT Jaguar", World Air Power Journal, vol. 11, London: Aerospace Publishing, pp. 52–111, ISBN 978-1-874023-96-8, ISSN 0959-7050.
- Jackson, Robert (2010), 101 Great Warships, Rosen, ISBN 978-1-4358-3596-2.
- Kupersmith, Douglas A (June 1993), The Failure of Third World Air Power (PDF), Air University Press, archived from the original (PDF) on February 26, 2013.
- Michell, Simon (1994), Civil and Military Aircraft Upgrades 1994–95, Coulsdon, UK: Jane's, ISBN 978-0-7106-1208-3.
- Nunez Padin, Jorge Felix (November 1993). "Les Super Etendards argentins" [Argentinian Super Etendards]. Avions: Toute l'aéronautique et son histoire (in French) (9): 2–7. ISSN 1243-8650.
- Polmar, Norman (2006), Aircraft Carriers: A History of Carrier Aviation and Its Influence on World Events, vol. I: 1909–1945, Potomac, ISBN 978-1-574886-63-4.
- Ripley, Tim. "Directory: Military Aircraft". Flight International, 25–31 May 2004. Sutton, UK: Reed Business Press, pp. 38–73.
- Taylor, John W.R. (ed). Jane's All The World's Aircraft 1982–83. London: Jane's Yearbooks, 1982. ISBN 0-7106-0748-2.
