= List of aircraft carriers of France =

The following is a list of aircraft carriers of France. Fifteen aircraft carriers have served the navy or been proposed since the 1910s.

As of 2026, one French carrier—Charles de Gaulle (R91)—remains in service of the French government.

== Key ==
Aircraft	The number of aircraft carried
Displacement	Ship displacement at full combat load
Propulsion	Number of shafts, type of propulsion system, and top speed generated
Service	The dates work began and finished on the ship and its ultimate fate
Laid down	The date the keel began to be assembled
Commissioned	The date the ship was commissioned

== Seaplane carriers ==
=== Foudre ===
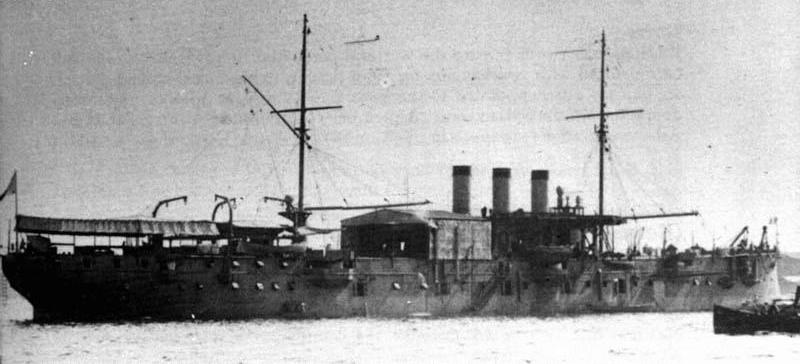
Foudre, 1912

Ship	Aircraft	Displacement	Propulsion	Service		
Ship	Aircraft	Displacement	Propulsion	Laid down	Commissioned	Fate
Foudre (converted torpedo boat tender)	4	6,100 t (6,000 long tons)	24 boilers, triple expansion engines, 2 shafts	9 June 1892	1896 (1912 as carrier)	Decommissioned on 1 December 1921 and scrapped

=== Commandant Teste ===
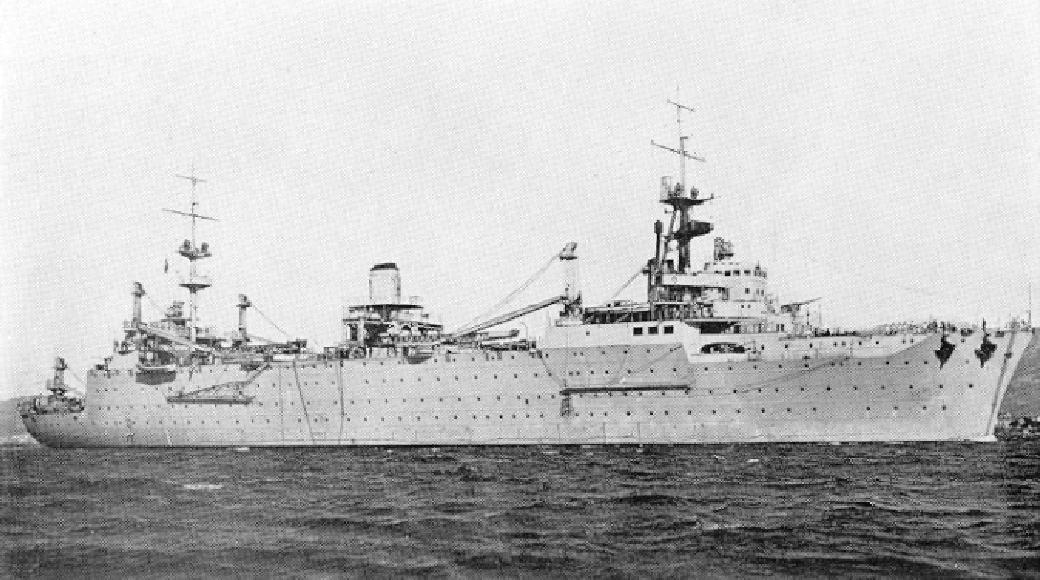
Commandant Teste

Ship	Aircraft	Displacement	Propulsion	Service		
Ship	Aircraft	Displacement	Propulsion	Laid down	Commissioned	Fate
Commandant Teste	26	12,134 t (11,942 long tons)	4 water-tube boilers, 2 geared steam turbines, 2 shafts	6 September 1927	18 April 1932	Scuttled at Toulon on 27 November 1942; Sold for scrap on 15 May 1950

== Escort carriers ==
=== Avenger class ===
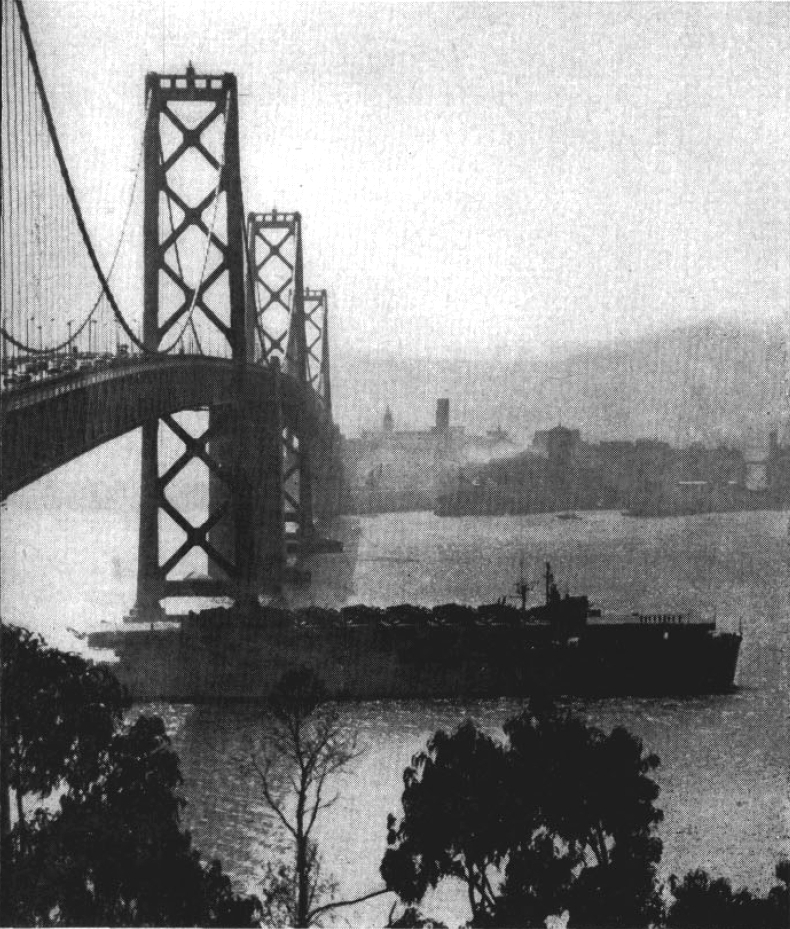
Dixmude at San Francisco, c. 1952

Ship	Aircraft	Displacement	Propulsion	Service		
Ship	Aircraft	Displacement	Propulsion	Laid down	Commissioned	Fate
Dixmude (A609) (ex-HMS Biter, ex-Rio Parana)	15-21	9,100 t (9,000 long tons)	4 diesel engines, 1 shaft	28 December 1939	9 April 1945 (as Dixmude)	Returned to the USN on 17 June 1966, sunk in exercise "Deep Six" the next day

== Fleet carriers ==
=== Béarn ===
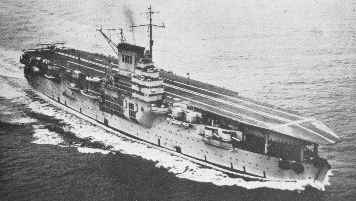
Béarn, 1937

Ship	Aircraft	Displacement	Propulsion	Service		
Ship	Aircraft	Displacement	Propulsion	Laid down	Commissioned	Fate
Béarn (converted Normandie class)	35-40	28,900 t (28,400 long tons)	2 reciprocating steam engines, 2 Parsons geared steam turbines, 4 shafts	10 January 1914	May 1927	Sold for scrap on 31 May 1967

=== Joffre class ===
Joffre class

Ship	Aircraft	Displacement	Propulsion	Service		
Ship	Aircraft	Displacement	Propulsion	Laid down	Commissioned	Fate
Joffre	40	20,000 t (20,000 long tons)	8 water-tube boilers, 2 geared Parsons steam turbine sets, 2 shafts	18 November 1938		Scrapped
Painlevé						Cancelled

=== Independence class ===
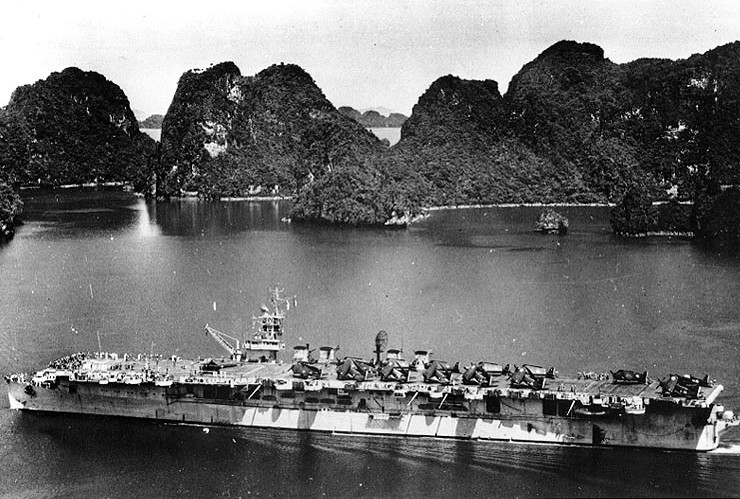
La Fayette (R96) in Indochina, 1953

Ship	Aircraft	Displacement	Propulsion	Service		
Ship	Aircraft	Displacement	Propulsion	Laid down	Commissioned	Fate
Bois Belleau (R97) (ex-USS Belleau Wood)	33	15,300 t (15,100 long tons)	Steam turbines, 4 propellers	11 August 1941	5 September 1953 (as Bois Belleau)	Returned to the USN in September 1960
La Fayette (R96) (ex-USS Langley)	33	15,300 t (15,100 long tons)	Steam turbines, 4 propellers	11 April 1942	1951 (as La Fayette)	Returned to the USN in March 1963

=== Colossus class ===
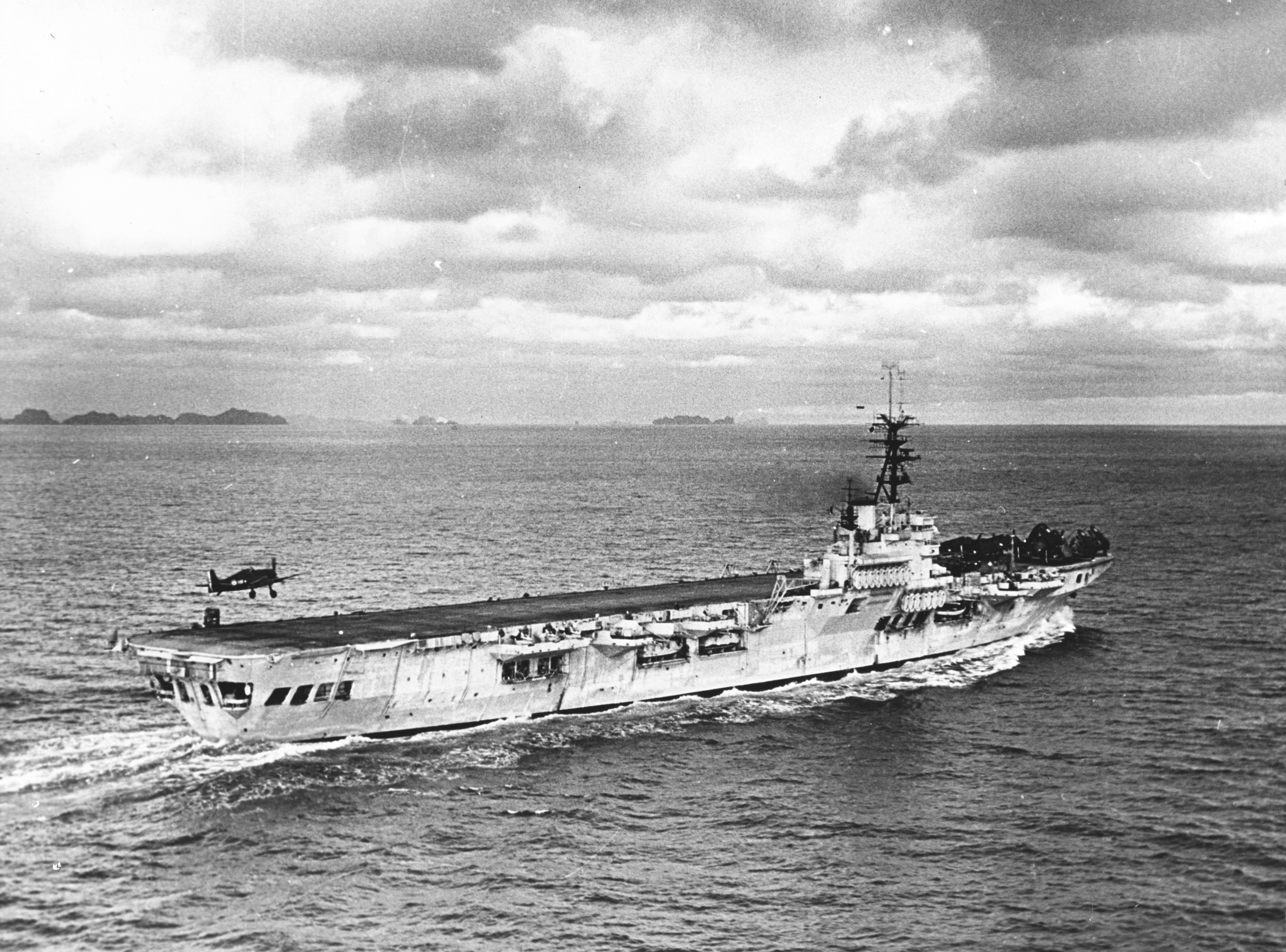
Arromanches (R95) operating in the Gulf of Tonkin, c. 1953

Ship	Aircraft	Displacement	Propulsion	Service		
Ship	Aircraft	Displacement	Propulsion	Laid down	Commissioned	Fate
Arromanches (R95) (ex-HMS Colossus)	48	18,300 t (18,000 long tons)	4 Admiralty 3-drum boilers, Parsons geared turbines, 2 shafts	1 June 1942	August 1946 (as Arromanches)	Decommissioned on 22 Jan 1974; Scrapped 1978

=== Clemenceau class ===
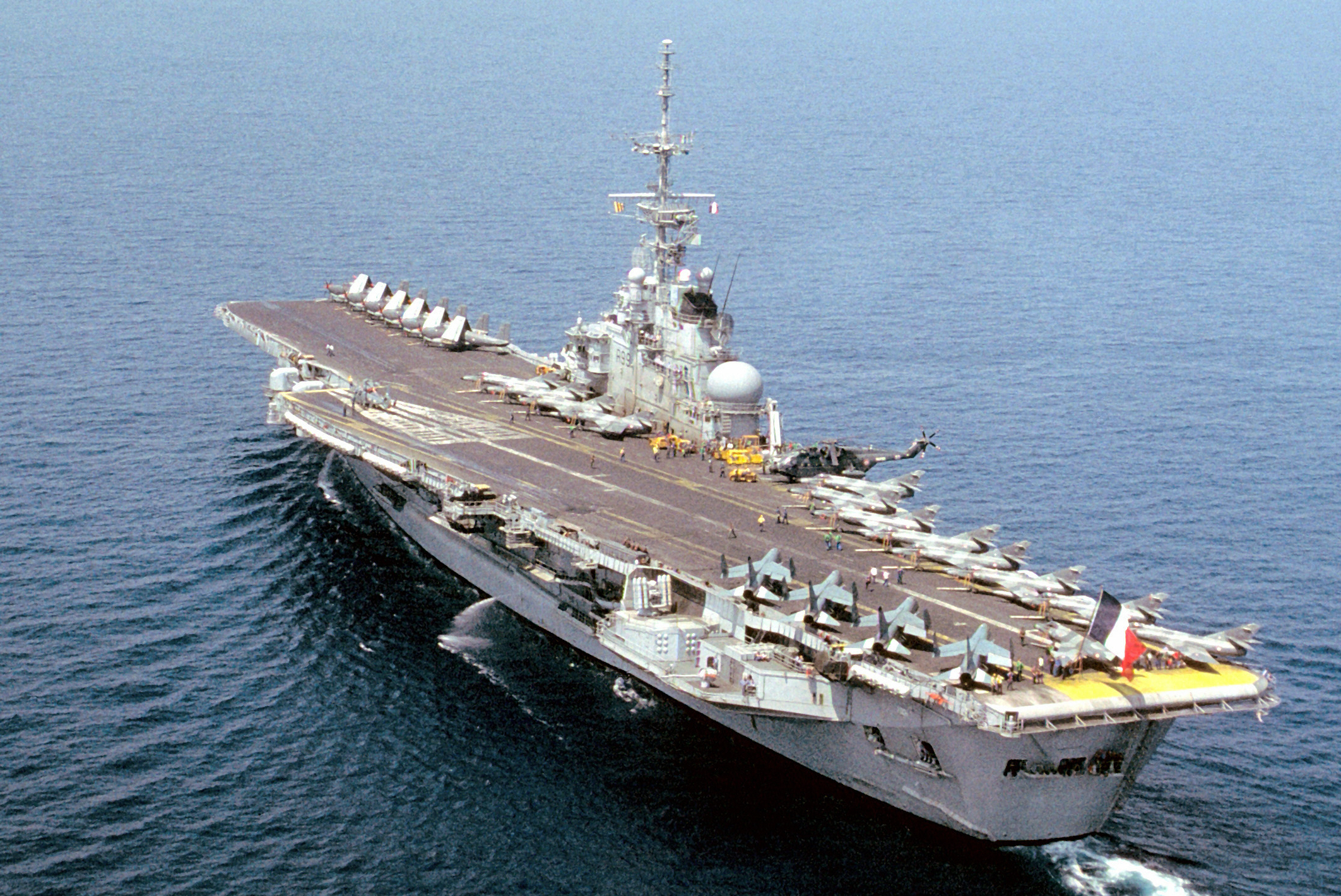
Foch (R99) underway during exercise Dragon Hammer, 1992

Ship	Aircraft	Displacement	Propulsion	Service		
Ship	Aircraft	Displacement	Propulsion	Laid down	Commissioned	Fate
Clemenceau (R98)	40	32,780 t (32,260 long tons)	6 Indret boilers, 4 steam turbines, 2 shafts	November 1955	22 November 1961	Decommissioned on 1 October 1997; Scrapped 2009
Foch (R99)	40	32,800 t (32,300 long tons)	6 Indret boilers, 4 steam turbines, 2 shafts	15 November 1957	15 July 1963	Decommissioned on 15 November 2000 and transferred to Brazil as São Paulo

=== Verdun ===
Ship	Aircraft	Displacement	Propulsion	Service		
Ship	Aircraft	Displacement	Propulsion	Laid down	Commissioned	Fate
Verdun	Unknown	45,000 t (44,000 long tons)	Steam turbines, 4 shafts			Cancelled 1961

=== Charles de Gaulle ===
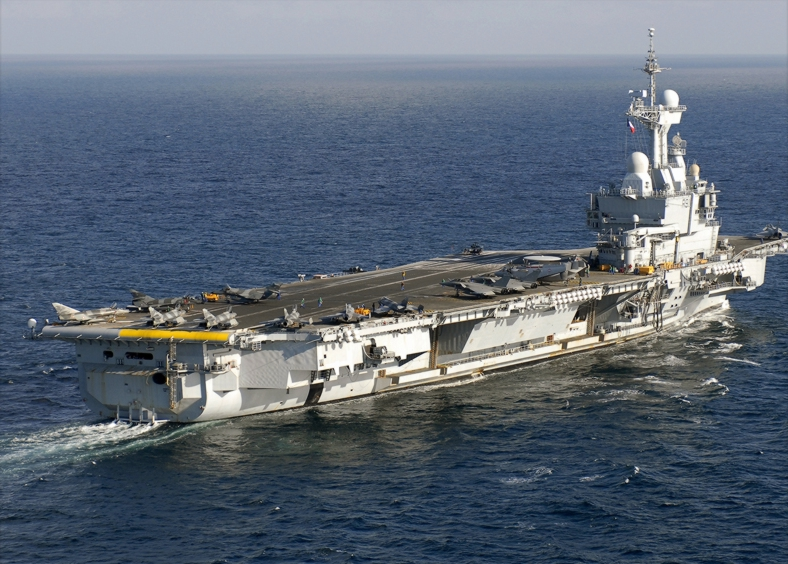
Charles de Gaulle (R91) underway, 2009

Ship	Aircraft	Displacement	Propulsion	Service		
Ship	Aircraft	Displacement	Propulsion	Laid down	Commissioned	Fate
Charles de Gaulle (R91)	28-40	42,500 t (41,829 long tons)	2 K15 pressurised water reactors (PWR), 4 diesel-electric, 2 shafts	14 April 1989	18 May 2001	In service

=== PA 2 ===
Ship	Aircraft	Displacement	Propulsion	Service		
Ship	Aircraft	Displacement	Propulsion	Laid down	Commissioned	Fate
PA 2	40	75,000 t (73,815 long tons)	2 RR MT-30 gas turbines, 4 diesel-electric engines, shafts			Cancelled 2013

=== France Libre ===
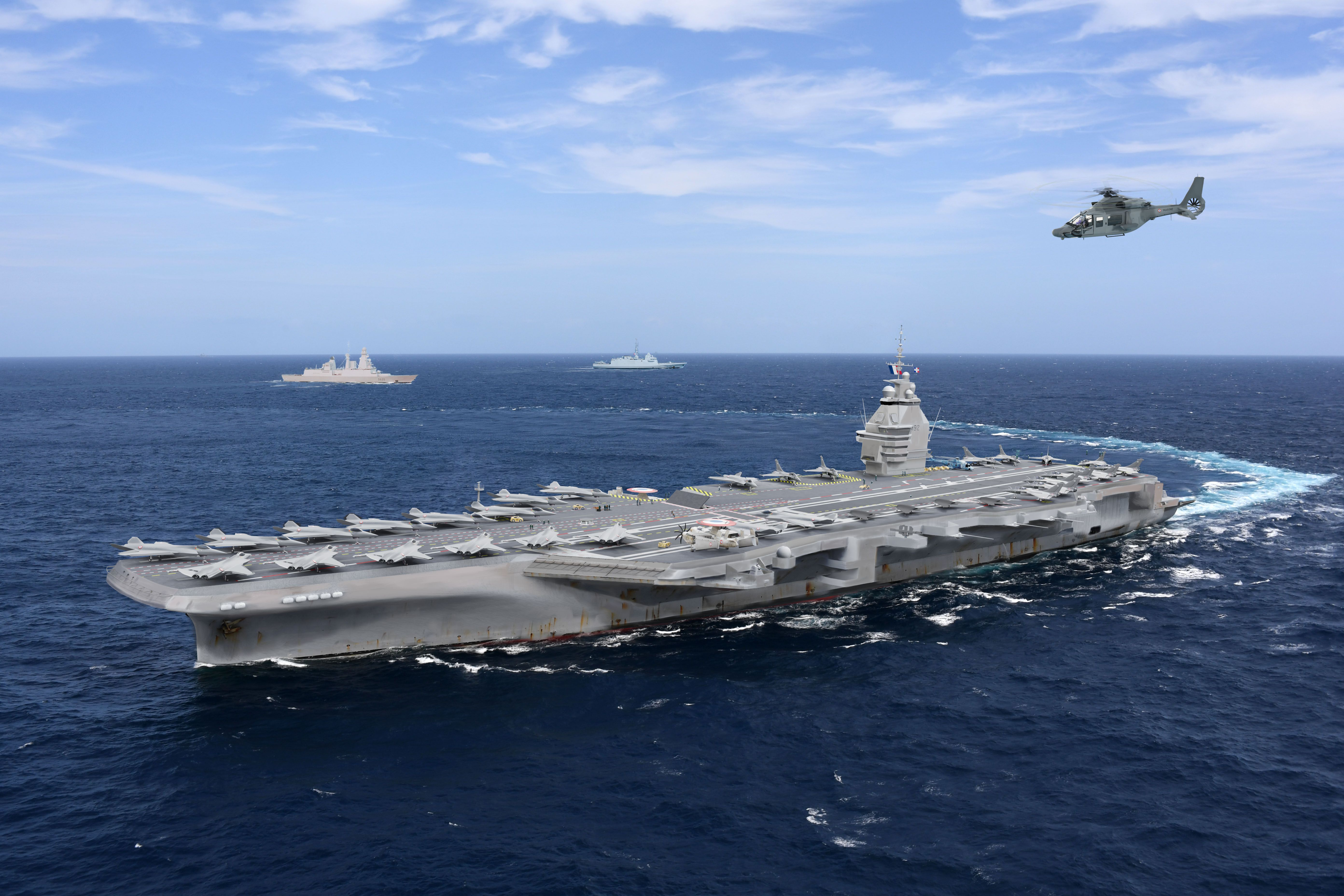
Artist's impression of PA-NG

Ship	Aircraft	Displacement	Propulsion	Service		
Ship	Aircraft	Displacement	Propulsion	Laid down	Commissioned	Fate
France Libre	40+	75,000 t (73,815 long tons)	2 × K22 pressurised water reactors (PWR), 220 MWth each		2038?	Preliminary design work

== Helicopter carriers ==
=== Jeanne d'Arc ===
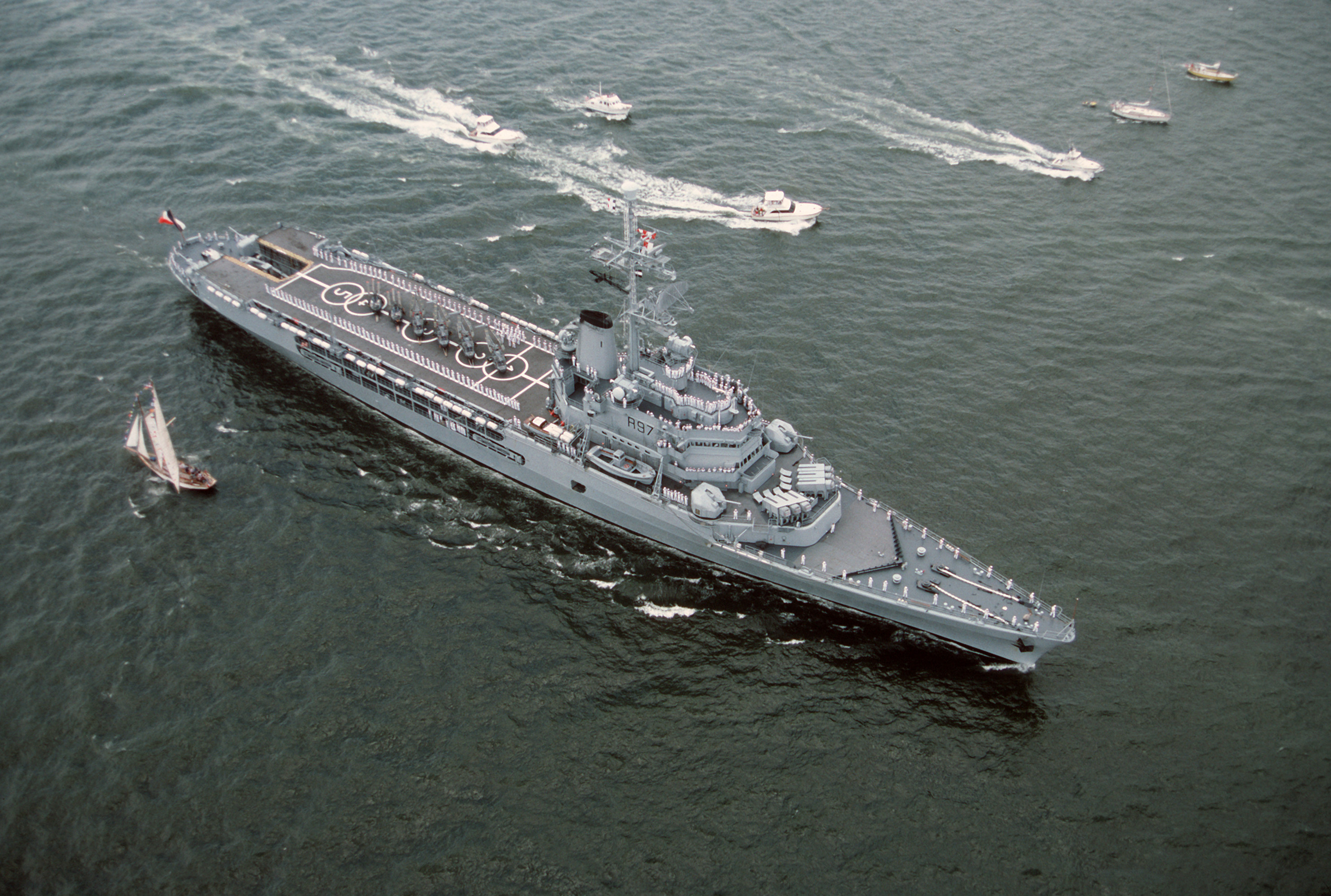
Jeanne d'Arc (R97) at New York on 4 July 1986

Ship	Aircraft	Displacement	Propulsion	Service		
Ship	Aircraft	Displacement	Propulsion	Laid down	Commissioned	Fate
Jeanne d'Arc (R97) (ex-La Résolue)	4-8	13,270 t (13,060 long tons)	Four 10,000 horsepower (7.5 MW) power plants with automatic heating	1959	16 July 1964	Decommissioned on 1 September 2010

=== PH 75 ===
Ship	Aircraft	Displacement	Propulsion	Service		
Ship	Aircraft	Displacement	Propulsion	Laid down	Commissioned	Fate
Unknown	25	18,400 t (18,100 long tons)	CAS-230 nuclear reactor, 2 shafts			Cancelled 1981
Unknown	25	18,400 t (18,100 long tons)	CAS-230 nuclear reactor, 2 shafts			Cancelled 1981

== See also ==
- List of active French Navy ships
- List of aircraft carriers
- List of aircraft carriers of the United States Navy
- List of aircraft carriers of the Royal Navy
- List of aircraft carriers by country
