= French ship Foch =

At least two ships of the French Navy have borne the name Foch:

- French cruiser Foch, a Suffren-class cruiser launched in 1929 and scuttled in 1942
- French aircraft carrier Foch, a Clemenceau-class aircraft carrier launched in 1959 and sold to Brazil in 2000 as São Paulo. She was stricken in 2017
