= French aircraft carrier Verdun =

French naval project, cancelled 1961

Verdun
History

France
- Name: Verdun
- Ordered: 1958
- Fate: Cancelled in 1961

General characteristics
- Type: Aircraft carrier
- Displacement: 35,000 tons (Standard); 45,000 tons (Full Load)
- Length: 262 m (859 ft 7 in) (waterline); 286.3 m (939 ft 4 in) (overall)
- Beam: 34 m (111 ft 7 in) (waterline); 58 m (190 ft 3 in) (overall)
- Draught: 9.14 m (30 ft 0 in)
- Propulsion: Steam turbines; 4 shafts; 200,000 shp (150,000 kW)
- Speed: 33 knots (61 km/h; 38 mph)
- Armament: 2 × Masurca surface-to-air missiles; 4 × 100 mm/55-caliber modèle 53 DP guns

Verdun ([vɛʁdœ̃]) was an aircraft carrier under development in France in the 1950s which was cancelled before design was completed.

== History ==
With the Clemenceau-class aircraft carriers soon to enter service, the French Navy launched an effort to build a larger carrier specifically with the nuclear strike role in mind. Construction of the carrier was considered in 1958 but due to cost the program was cancelled in 1961.

For more than 30 years, France would rely on the Clemenceau class to provide fixed wing aviation. These two ships were modified in the 1980s to accommodate AN-52 nuclear bombs, taking part of the role of the cancelled Verdun. France built a new carrier finally in the form of Charles de Gaulle at the end of the 1990s.

== See also ==
- List of aircraft carriers of France
