= Brazilian aircraft carrier São Paulo =

Aircraft carrier in service from 2000 to 2018

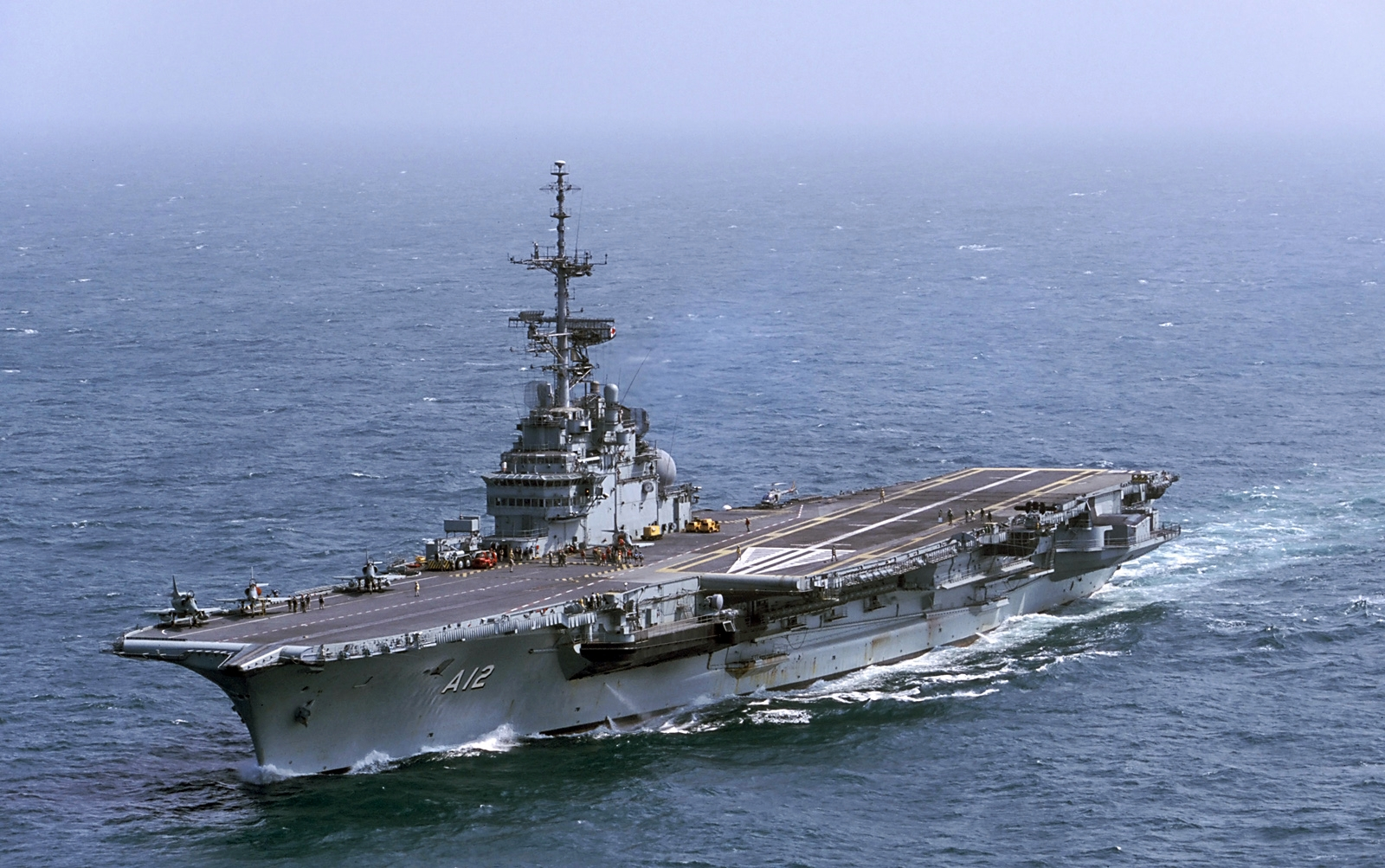
- As Sao Paulo, 2013

History

France
- Name: Foch
- Ordered: 1955
- Laid down: 15 November 1957
- Launched: 18 July 1959
- Commissioned: 15 July 1963
- Decommissioned: 15 November 2000
- Identification: Pennant number: R99
- Fate: Sold to the Brazilian Navy

Brazil
- Name: São Paulo
- Namesake: São Paulo
- Acquired: September 2000
- Commissioned: 15 November 2000
- Decommissioned: 22 November 2018
- Out of service: 14 February 2017
- Stricken: 22 November 2018
- Identification: MMSI number: 710442000; Callsign: PWSP; Pennant number: A12
- Motto: "Non ducor, duco"
- Fate: Scuttled on 3 February 2023
- Notes: see Foch (R99) for prior history
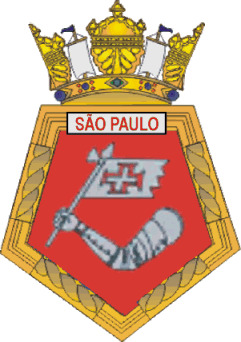
- Badge

General characteristics
- Class & type: Clemenceau-class aircraft carrier
- Displacement: 24,200 tonnes; 32,800 tonnes (full load)
- Length: 265 m (869 ft 5 in)
- Beam: 31.7 m (104 ft 0 in)
- Draught: 8.60 m (28 ft 3 in)
- Propulsion: 6 Indret boilers, 4 steam turbines producing 126,000 hp (94,000 kW), 2 propellers
- Speed: 32 knots (59 km/h)
- Range: 7,500 nautical miles (13,900 km) at 18 knots (33 km/h; 21 mph)
- Complement: 1,338 (1,920 including the air group). 984 if only helicopters are carried.
- Electronic warfare & decoys: DRBV-23B air sentry radar; DRBV-50 low-altitude or surface sentry radar (later replaced by a DRBV-15); NRBA-50 approach radar; DRBI-10 tri-dimensional air sentry radar; several DRBC-31 fire radar (later DRBC-32C); DRBN-34 navigation radars
- Armament: four 100 mm turrets, two SACP Crotale EDIR systems, five 12.7 mm machine guns, 4 dual Simbad launchers
- Aircraft carried: 39 aircraft: 22 jets and 17 helicopters. A-4KU Skyhawks, AS 532 SC Cougars, HB 350 & HB.355 Ecureuils, and SH-3 Sea Kings

NAe (Note: Navio-Aeródromo, "Aircraft carrier" (lit: "Airfield-Ship").) São Paulo (pennant number A12) was a Clemenceau-class aircraft carrier in service with the Brazilian Navy. São Paulo was first commissioned in 1963 by the French Navy as Foch and was transferred in 2000 to Brazil, where she became the new flagship of the Brazilian Navy. IHS Jane's reported that during her career with the Brazilian Navy, São Paulo suffered from serviceability issues and never managed to operate for more than three months at a time without the need for repairs and maintenance.

On 14 February 2017, the navy announced the ship's demobilisation and subsequent decommissioning. On 12 March 2021 the carrier was sold to be scrapped. After Turkey rejected permission to dock, the Brazilian Navy scuttled the ship in the Atlantic Ocean on 3 February 2023, some 350 kilometres (220 mi) off the Brazilian coast in 5,000 metres (16,000 ft) of water.

== Background ==
The aircraft carrier São Paulo was built in France between 1957 and 1960, and served in the French Navy as Foch. In September 2000, she was purchased by Brazil for US$12 million – no aircraft were included in the price – to replace the aged World War II-era carrier Minas Gerais, which had been in commission for over 40 years. Brazil had previously approached other countries, such as Spain, who wanted to construct a US$500 million carrier for Brazil, about the acquisition of a carrier. The government had already purchased a squadron of 23 used A-4 Skyhawk fighter planes from Kuwait for $70 million; these planes, along with existing helicopters already in the national defense inventory, were to compose the São Paulo fighter-bomber group. These A-4s (designated AF-1) are capable of carrying armament including rockets, free-fall bombs, and Sidewinder air-to-air missiles.

The Clemenceau-class aircraft carriers, of which São Paulo was the last surviving member, are of conventional CATOBAR design. The flight deck is 265.5 metres (871 ft) long by 29.5 metres (97 ft) wide; the landing area is angled at 8 degrees off of the ship's axis. The forward aircraft elevator is to starboard, and the rear elevator is positioned on the deck edge to save hangar space. The forward of two 52-metre (171 ft) catapults is on the bow to port; the second catapult is farther back on the angled landing deck. The hangar deck dimensions are 152 metres (499 ft) by 22 to 24 metres (72 to 79 ft) with 7 metres (23 ft) overhead.

In September 2000, São Paulo was purchased while still operational, an unusual process for such a large ship. She was received by the Brazilian Navy and was incorporated into the Brazilian Navy on 15 November 2000. The incorporation of São Paulo and the AF-1 fighter group marked the realization of Brazil's long-held goal of being able to conduct aerial defense of its naval forces with fixed-wing aircraft.

President Fernando Henrique Cardoso noted during the transfer ceremony that:

The transfer of the aircraft carrier São Paulo to the Operative Sector of the Navy adds to our naval power an important magnification in its ability of defense of the Brazilian interests at sea. A country as ours, possessing an extensive coast, with more than 7,000 kilometers of coast, requires a naval power compatible with its stature in the international scene. Today, as before, Brazil is concerned about implementing concrete measures that offer the nation the guarantee of respect to its sovereignty. We are and we will always be a nation that fights for peace, however, that does not mean being able to do without modern Armed Forces, enabled and endowed with adequate dissuasive potential. Few countries, even today, have the capacity to operate with efficiency in the high seas. It is important that Brazil continues to be one of them."

Since her construction, São Paulo received multiple upgrades, leaving her with a diverse range of technologies. The carrier arrived in Rio de Janeiro on 17 February 2001. São Paulo's complement was 1,920 (the ship's company was 64 officers and 1274 sailors, with an additional 582 in the air group).

== Brazilian service ==
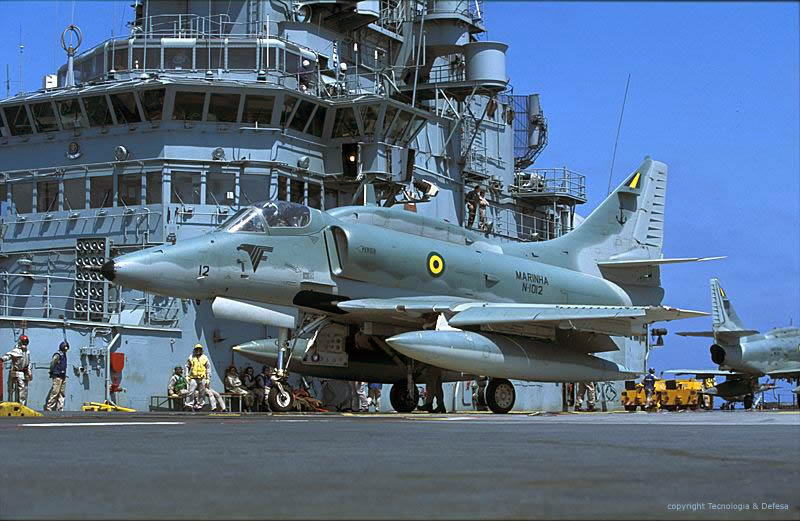
An AF-1 Skyhawk (A-4KU) on board São Paulo

In her first three years of service as São Paulo, the ship completed several missions, some in foreign waters, particularly Operations ARAEX, PASSEX, and TEMPEREX, which is used annually to qualify and train the Argentine Navy's Super Étendards and S-2T Turbo Trackers.

Toward the end of her commissioned life, São Paulo mainly served to train pilots to fly carrier operations. She was actively used for the carrier qualification and re-qualification of rotary and fixed-wing pilots, and also to practice carrier-based attack missions.

=== 2005 fire ===
On 17 May 2005, an explosion took place in a steam pipeline in the engine room. The explosion initially killed one crew member and injured ten others. All casualties were airlifted by helicopter to the Naval Hospital Marcílio Dias in Rio de Janeiro. Two of the injured crew later died in the hospital from their injuries. The cause of the explosion was a rupture in a steam pipeline. After this accident, the Navy decided to undertake an extensive overhaul to repair and modernize the ship.

=== Upgrade (2005–2010) and sea trials ===
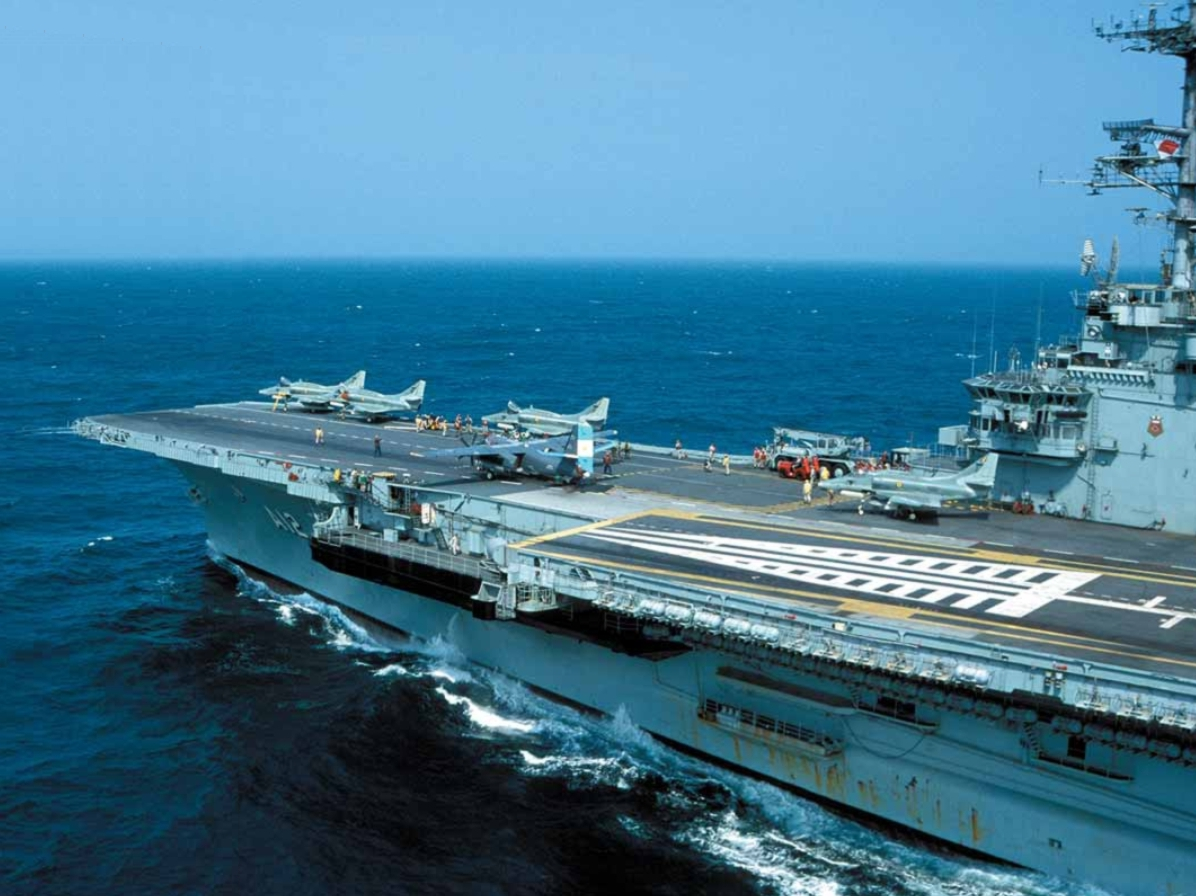
View of the forward flight deck of São Paulo in 2003. Four McDonnell Douglas AF-1 Skyhawk fighters and an Argentine Navy Grumman S-2T Tracker are visible.

During 2005–10, São Paulo underwent extensive modernization. The upgrade included repair of the steam turbines; maintenance of the surface condensers; retubing of boilers; repair of two high-pressure compressors; revision of the AC electrical generator; purchase of spare parts; maintenance of pumps, valves, and structural items; addition of two API oil-water separators; installation of two water cooling units; upgrade of the chemical oxygen generator; repair and treatment of oil tanks; substitution of the Naval Tactical Data System, installation of a closed-circuit television system; installation of an IFF transponder; installation of a MAGE system (ESM), flight deck inspection, repair, and painting; upgrade of the Optical Landing System processing unit; and revision of the aircraft catapults. The upgrade was completed in July 2009, and the São Paulo was initially due to be fully operational by August 2010.

Twelve Brazilian Navy A-4 Skyhawks were also scheduled to be upgraded by Embraer at a cost of $140 million. The upgrade was similar to the ones done for the AMX and F-5EM aircraft of the Brazilian Air Force. The program included restoring the aircraft and their current systems, as well as implementing new avionics, radar (specifically the Elta 2032 radar system), power production, and autonomous oxygen generating systems. Possible weapons to be included in the upgrade were MAA-1B, Python 4, and Derby AAMS.

The Brazilian Navy contracted Marsh Aviation to convert four S-2T Turbo Trackers to an airborne early warning (AEW) configuration, and four more for tanking and Carrier Onboard Delivery duties.

According to an article in the October 2010 issue of Air Forces Monthly, it was confirmed that Brazil had purchased ex-Australian and ex-Uruguayan C-1 Trader airframes, for conversion into AEW planes and tanker aircraft. The Brazilian Navy planned upgrades of the airframes to S-2T Turbo Tracker configuration with Honeywell TPE 331-14GR engines. The purchase included nine airframes, of which two were for tanker conversion to refuel the AF-1 Skyhawks, and three were for AEW. The rest were purchased for spares or for cargo duties. The AEW radar requirement was to have a range of 250 miles (400 km) at 25,000 feet (7,600 m). The operational lifespan for the airframes was to be 10 years. They were expected to be ready in 2011 and 2012.

São Paulo's SH-3 helicopter fleet was to be replaced by six S-70B Seahawk helicopters. They were purchased in 2008, upgraded, and refurbished for delivery. The helicopters and a package of engines and support equipment were scheduled for delivery in 2009.

At the end of 2010, sea trials began, and as of 2011 São Paulo had been evaluated by the CIASA (Inspection Commission and Training Advisory).

=== Refit and delayed decommissioning (2012–2022) ===
São Paulo was expected to rejoin the fleet in late 2013, but suffered another major fire in 2012. In 2017, the Navy announced the ship would be demobilized and decommissioned, citing the uneconomical cost of further repairs. The Brazilian Navy formally decommissioned São Paulo on 22 November 2018.

Scheduled to arrive at Aliağa, Turkey on 7 September 2022 for scrapping, the ship was towed from Rio de Janeiro on 4 August 2022 by the Dutch tugboat Alp Centre, after being bought for R$10,550,000.00 (ca. US$ 1.9 million) from Sök. The ship and her tugboat arrived off the Moroccan coast on 26 August, preparing to enter the Mediterranean Sea through Gibraltar, when the Turkish government suddenly withdrew permission for the ship to dock in Turkey. This decision was made after officials at the Turkish Ministry of the Environment determined that the report submitted by Brazilian authorities significantly underestimated the amount of hazardous material aboard the ship when compared to ships of the same class and period. For example, the report estimated the presence of only 9.6 tons of asbestos when Clemenceau — São Paulo's sister ship — contained at least 600 tons of this carcinogenic material. The Turkish government also cited the carrier's participation in France's 1960s nuclear tests as part of Alfa Force, which raised the possibility of residual radioactive contamination. The convoy reversed course and headed back to Rio de Janeiro.

After the decommissioning was announced, a private foundation called Instituto São Paulo/Foch (ISP) formed by former crew and enthusiasts attempted to transform the carrier into a museum ship. Previous plans to make a museum ship of her predecessor, Minas Gerais, had been aborted. ISP was responsible for the judicial order to tow the ship back to Brazil. Concerns over the potential risk of "massive ecological damage" were made by several national and international environmentalist organizations.

A lawyer instrumental in the ship's return characterized the overall handling of the matter as severely rushed and negligent, with authorities bypassing proper evaluation and selling the ship for a fraction of the real value. The foundation was also barred from the auction as Brazilian authorities were only interested in companies seeking to dismantle the ship. The Brazilian Navy refused to allow the ship to anchor again in Rio de Janeiro, and sent the convoy to a port in Suape, Pernambuco, where she was again not allowed to anchor, and had thus been waiting in the waters for a pending cleanup by the Navy.

=== Scuttling (2023) ===
On 20 January 2023, the ship was seized and put out to sea by the Brazilian Navy, who declared it would scuttle the São Paulo into the Atlantic Ocean in February 2023, following the rejections of injunctions from Ministry of the Environment and the Federal Public Ministry by a federal judge.

The Navy stated that the São Paulo's deteriorating condition and the "inevitability of uncontrolled sinking" gave the navy no other option, even with an offer of R$30 million (US$6 million) from Sela Saudi Arabian Jeddah group to buy her for three times more than the Turkish company paid. Plans to scuttle her approximately 350 kilometres (220 mi) off the coast of Brazil in international waters, 5,000 m deep, just within the outer limit of Brazil's exclusive economic zone were announced. The Public Ministry appealed against the judicial decision, but the appeal was rejected. The Navy spent R$37.2 million to sink the decommissioned aircraft carrier São Paulo, which had been sold for R$10 million.

The former Turkish owners of the ship criticized the decision as showing indifference and attempts to evade responsibility by the Brazilian authorities. The Brazilian Navy said that her hull already had three holes in it and sinking would have been inevitable before the end of the month. São Paulo was scuttled on 3 February 2023.

== Gallery ==
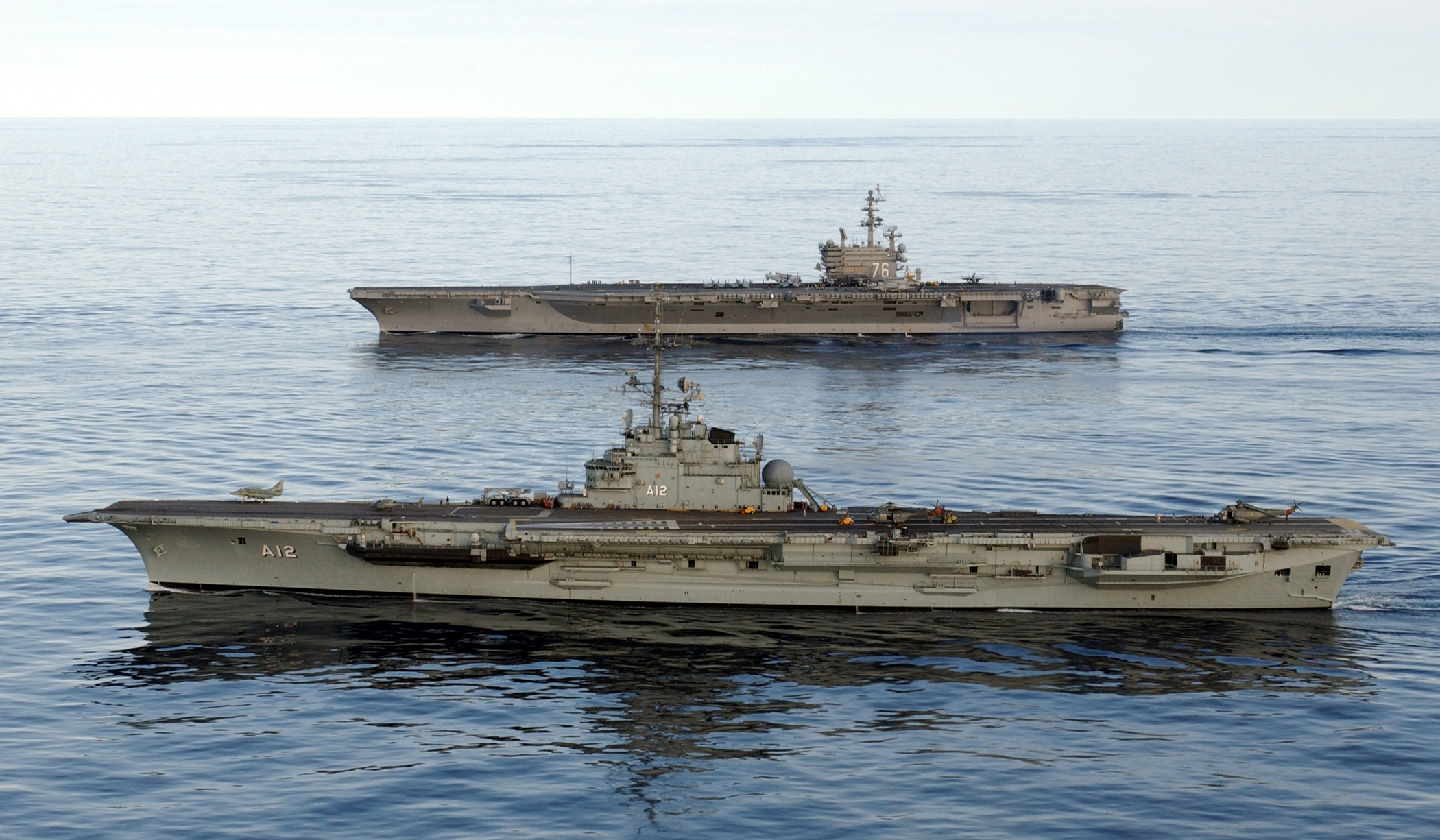
São Paulo (foreground) and USS Ronald Reagan during a combined training exercise in June 2004

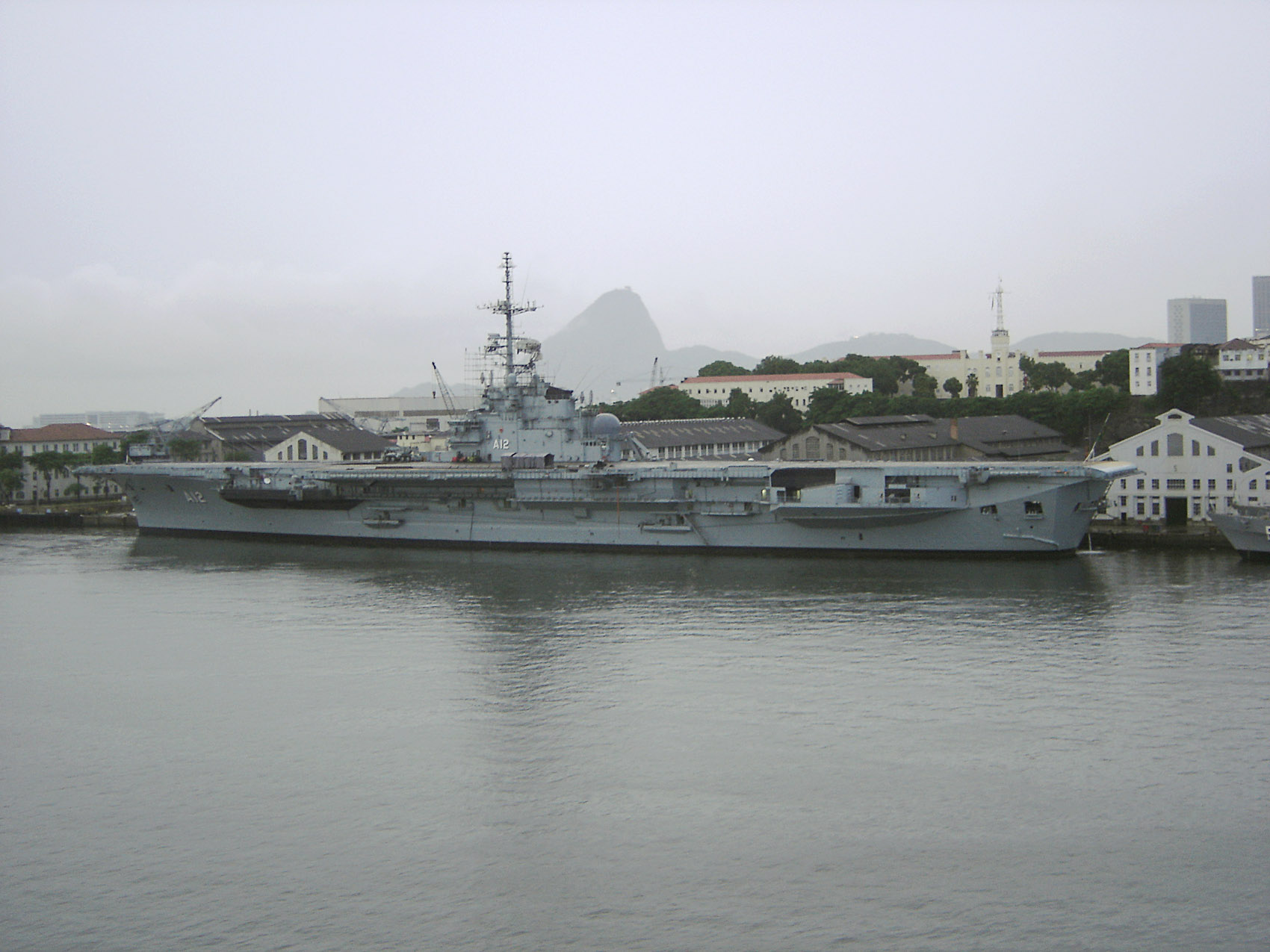
São Paulo in Rio de Janeiro in 2007

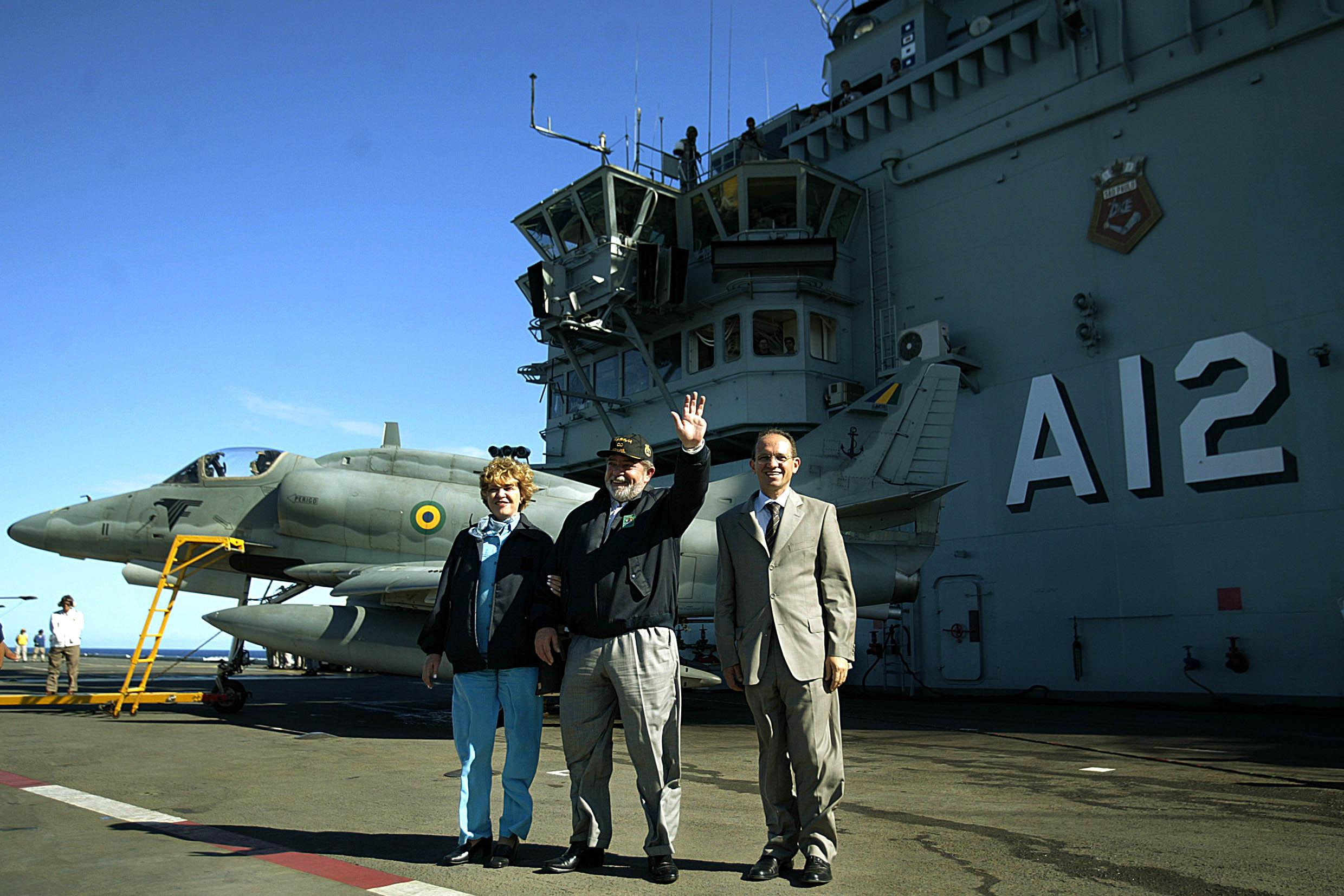
President Lula, his wife Marisa Letícia and Espírito Santo's governor Paulo Hartung aboard São Paulo, August 2004

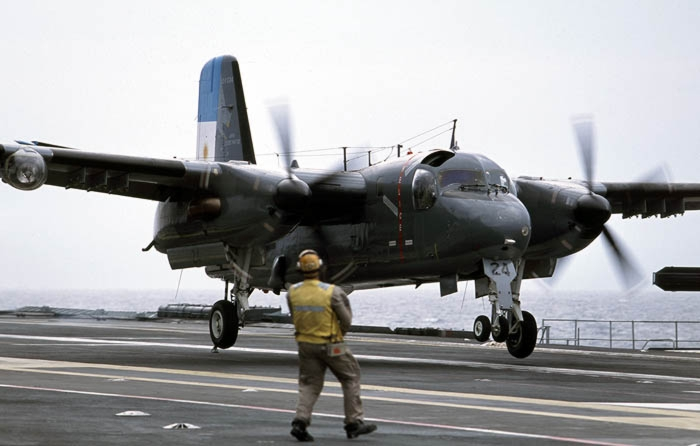
Argentine Navy Turbo Tracker operating on São Paulo

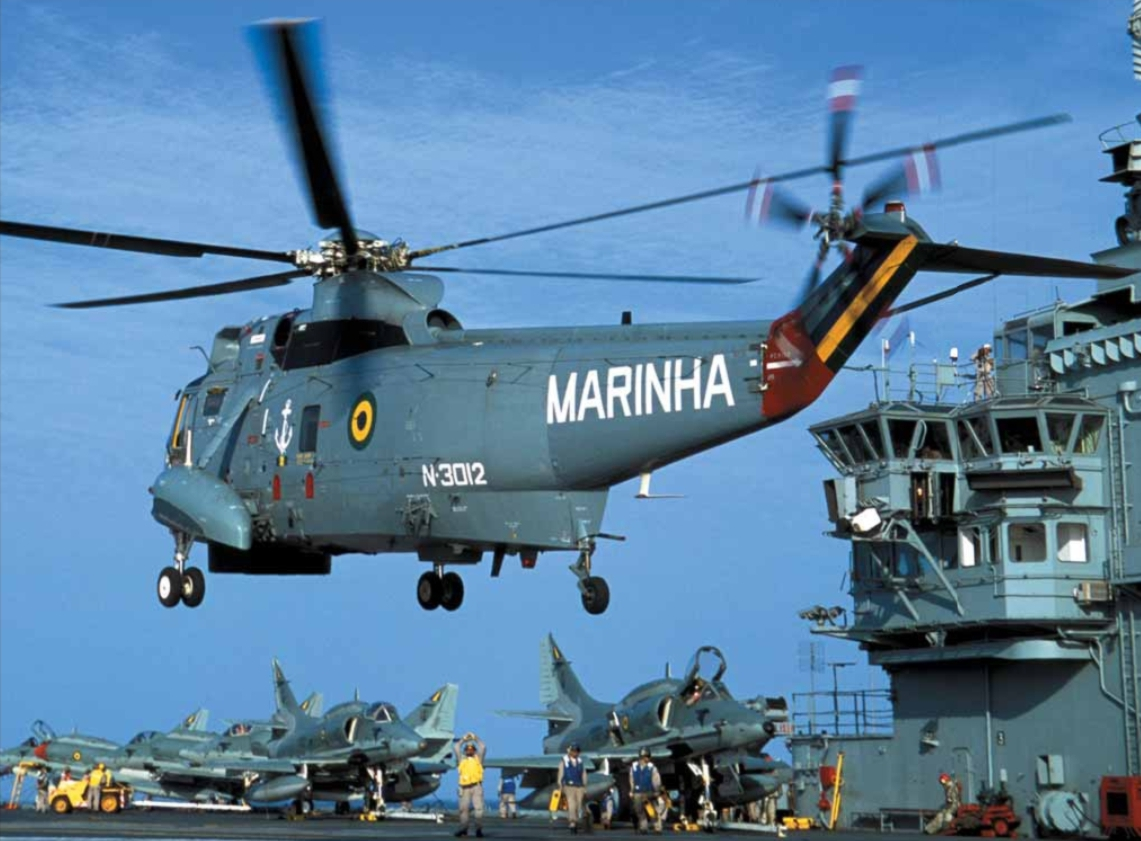
Sea King landing in 2003

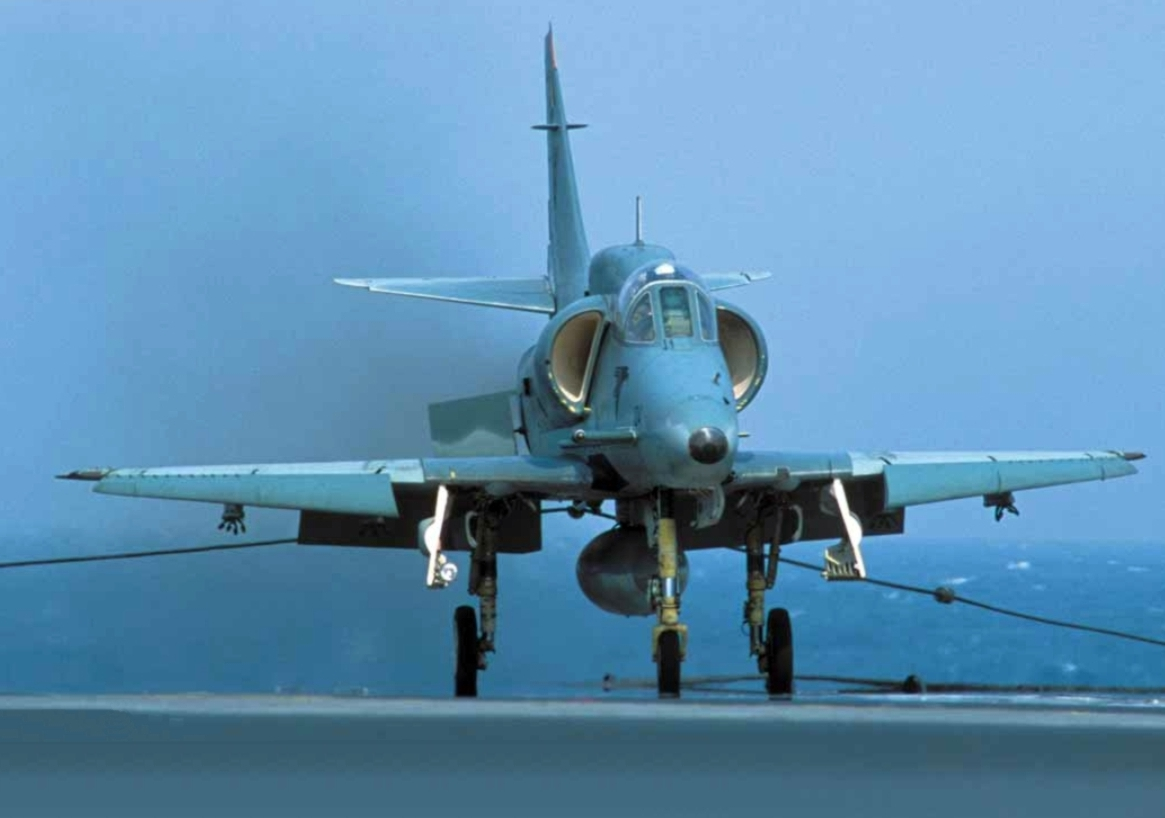
McDonnell Douglas AF-1 Skyhawk (A-4KU) from fighter squadron VF-1 Falcões catching the arrestor wire aboard São Paulo

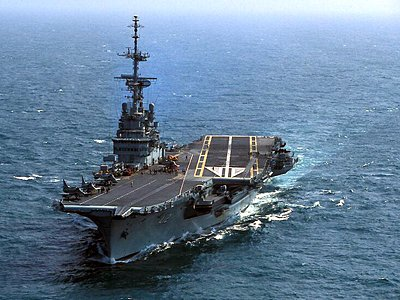
São Paulo at sea

== See also ==
- List of aircraft carriers
- NAeL Minas Gerais
- Brazilian amphibious assault ship Atlântico
- List of historical ships of the Brazilian Navy
