= Richard Valeriani =

U.S. Civil Rights journalist and White House correspondent

- Born: August 29, 1932
- Died: June 18, 2018 (aged 85)
- Occupation: Journalist
- Employer: NBC News

Richard Valeriani (August 29, 1932 – June 18, 2018) was an American journalist who was a White House correspondent and diplomatic correspondent with NBC News in the 1960s and 1970s. He previously covered the Civil Rights Movement for the network and was seriously injured when hit in the head with an ax handle at a demonstration in Marion, Alabama, in 1965.

== Career ==
Valeriani spoke five languages and began his career in the 1950s covering the Bay of Pigs in Cuba. However, his seemingly most important works were in the Civil Rights Movement of the 1960s. He reported on the important happenings at Selma and Marion Alabama, along with numerous other civil rights happenings.

External videos
- “Eyes on the Prize; Interview with Richard Valeriani” conducted in 1985 for the Eyes on the Prize documentary.

In an interview conducted by Eyes on the Prize, on December 10, 1985, Valeriani said, "I think the Selma campaign was kind of the culmination of the movement. They had gone through the exercise in Albany, Georgia... they had the experience in Birmingham... so they refined a lot of their techniques and so I think Selma was carried out with that experience." He was one of the reporters covering Selma, Albany, and Birmingham; which is how he knew what the movement members went through in order to prepare for Selma.

In that same interview Valeriani, in response to a question about whether the press was hated as much as the movement participants, he said, "Um, yeah, I think a lot of people identified us with the movement. We were in the middle... If you wanted to do something, well you couldn't do anything anyway, you couldn't write an editorial as a reporter, the best you could do, um, and you did it as much for the news value..." He was in just as much danger as the movement participants because of this association with the movement. He would get complaints from the white population saying he was instigating aggravators for promoting the movement; while there were complaints from the movement saying that he wasn't promoting the movement enough. Based on this he couldn't satisfy both sides of the argument in the nation.

February 18, 1965 in Marion, Alabama, there was a march from the Baptist Church to the jail. Although this was only a half block march, they were met with strong opposition from the police. This was nothing short of a mass beating when the police moved in on the marchers. During this time, Valeriani was hit in the back on the head with an axe handle and put in the hospital because of his injuries. This was an infamous time for Valeriani. He continued his work throughout the movement.

In July 1962, he interviewed Marion King, the wife of Slater King, who had been beaten by policemen in Camilla, Georgia, while trying to take clothes to jailed civil rights protesters from Albany, Georgia.

Valeriani portrayed himself as a reporter for CNN from the deck of the French aircraft carrier Foch in the 1995 film Crimson Tide, providing the opening newscast which sets up the plot. He reappeared again in the aftermath of the conflict.

As a participant in the events portrayed in the 2014 film Selma, Valeriani considered the film excellent and substantially accurate in presenting the role of media such as Roy Reed of The New York Times, but found the role of television underplayed.
