= Clemenceau-class aircraft carrier =

Class of French aircraft carriers

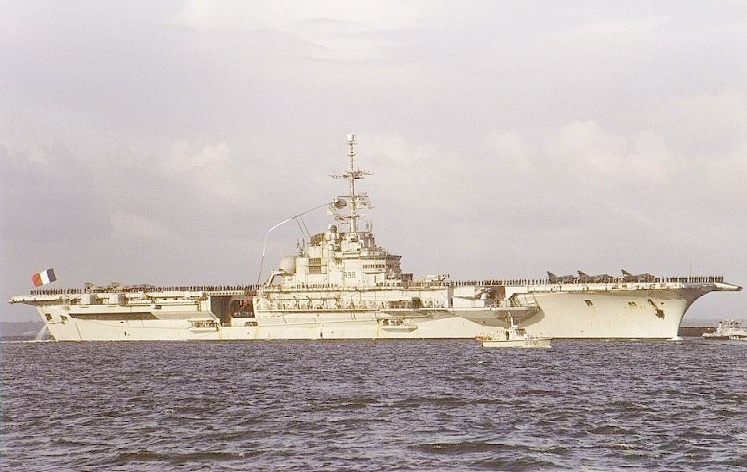
- Clemenceau

Class overview
- Builders: DCAN, Arsenal de Brest; Chantiers de l'Atlantique
- Operators: French Navy; Brazilian Navy
- Preceded by: Joffre class (planned); Béarn (actual)
- Succeeded by: Charles de Gaulle
- In service: 1961–2017
- Completed: 2
- Lost: 1 (by deliberate scuttling)
- Scrapped: 1

General characteristics
- Type: Aircraft carrier
- Displacement: 22,000 standard; 32,780 maximum
- Length: 265 m (869 ft)
- Beam: 51.2 m (168 ft)
- Draught: 8.6 m (28 ft)
- Propulsion: 6 × boilers; 4 × steam turbines; 126,000 shaft horsepower (94,000 kW)
- Speed: 32 knots (59 km/h; 37 mph)
- Range: 7,500 miles (12,100 km; 6,500 nmi)
- Armament: 8 × 100mm (now 4 × dual Simbad launchers and 5 × 12.7 mm machine guns in São Paulo)
- Aircraft carried: 40
- Aviation facilities: Angled flight deck for CATOBAR operations

The Clemenceau-class aircraft carriers are a pair of aircraft carriers, Clemenceau and Foch, which served in the French Navy from 1961 until 2000. From 2000 to 2017, one ship served with the Brazilian Navy as the São Paulo.

The Clemenceau class was France's first successful aircraft carrier design after World War II. It was the backbone of the French fleet for the duration of its forty years of service.

== Background ==
By the early 1950s, the French Navy had in service a number of aircraft carriers, the most modern of which was Arromanches. However, all of them were small and increasingly incapable of operating modern aircraft, which were steadily increasing in size. To ensure French independence in defence matters, a new class of two modern fleet carriers was envisaged. Displacing just under 35,000 tons each, the new ships would be slightly smaller than the Royal Navy's newly commissioned 43,000 ton Audacious-class ships, but they would be capable ships for their size built from scratch to take advantage of the latest ideas in aircraft carrier design, including angled flight deck, steam catapults and mirror landing aid, and would operate a brand new generation of French-designed, carrier-based aircraft.

The draft statute prepared by the Naval General Staff in 1949 asked for four aircraft carriers of 20,000 tons to be available in two phases. At its meeting of 22 August 1949, the Supreme Council of the Navy was even more ambitious where they asked for a six aircraft carrier fleet. On 15 July 1952, the French Navy still wanted between two and five for the French Union (not available to the NATO). According to RCM 12, the final document of the Lisbon Conference of 1952, France should make available to NATO an aircraft carrier on D-day, two on day 30, three on day 180. However, by 1953, the Navy had to be satisfied with two aircraft carriers. The PA 54 Clemenceau, budgeted in 1953, was delayed until November 1955, the PA 55 Foch, budgeted for 1955, was delayed until February 1957. Between 1980 and 1981, she underwent a study to certify the platform before catapulting aircraft carrying missiles, bombs, AM-39 Exocet and tactical nuclear bombs. Both Clemenceau and Foch underwent a modernization and refit, replacing 4 of their 8 100mm guns with 2 Crotale air-defense systems. In 1997, Foch also received 2 Sadral launchers (for 6 Mistral missiles each); those launchers were purchased by France in 1994.

They would also have longer careers (until 1998 and 2000) when compared with the Audacious-class carriers, which were withdrawn in 1972 and 1978.

The Clemenceau-class aircraft carriers are of conventional CATOBAR design. The flight deck is 165.5 m (543 ft) long by 29.5 m (97 ft) wide; the landing area is angled at 8 degrees off of the ship's axis. The forward aircraft elevator is to starboard, and the rear elevator is positioned on the deck edge to save hangar space. The forward of two 170 ft (52 m) catapults is to port on the bow, the aft catapult is on the angled landing deck. The hangar deck dimensions are 152 m (499 ft) by 22–24 m (72–79 ft) with 7 m (23 ft) overhead.

== Air group ==
Designed from the outset as multi-role fleet carriers, the two Clemenceau-class ships initially in 1961 had an air group with ten aircraft each of the IVM attack version and IVP reconnaissance version of the Dassault Étendard IV strike fighter, a squadron of up to eight Breguet Alizé aircraft were embarked for the antisubmarine warfare mission, and in the air-defense role a squadron of Sud Aviation Aquilon (license-built de Havilland Sea Venom) fighters. They were also used for French amphibious assault operations with up to 30–40 helicopters (normal helicopter wing is 4 helicopters) deployed; just prior to the 1991 Gulf War as part of Operation Salamandre (the air component of Operation Daguet), Clemenceau ferried 30 Aérospatiale Gazelles and 12 Aérospatiale SA 330 Pumas to Saudi Arabia. The planned size of the total air wing was originally 60, but the increasing size of carrier-based aircraft in the late 1950s reduced that number to approximately 40.

The more capable, missile-armed Vought F-8E(FN) Crusader was soon deployed, with a squadron of eight aircraft embarked, starting 2 years later from 1963. The Crusader served with both carriers until Foch was decommissioned in 2000. The Dassault-Breguet Super Étendard entered service on both ships in 1978. The Super Étendard could carry both the Exocet missile and the Air-Sol Moyenne Portee (ASMP) nuclear missile, giving these ships a stand-off nuclear strike ability lacking in the earlier Étendard IV (equipped with free-fall nuclear bombs only).

Clemenceau and Foch were modernized during September 1977 – November 1978 and July 1980 – August 1981 (Foch). This mid-life upgrade cleared them for the new Super Étendard (along with several other upgrades, like the SENIT C3 system). Then they had up to 40 aircraft: 10 F-8FN, 15–16 Super Étendard and 3–4 Étendard IVP, 7 Alizé, 2 Super Frelon and 2 Alouette III. Their hangar measured 152 × 24 × 7 meters (3,648 square meters). Clemenceau's fuel depots were 1,200 mc (JP5) and 400 mc (AVGAS). Foch increased this amount up to 1,800 and 109 respectively.

The Dassault Rafale was test flown from Foch after deck modifications in 1992 and operated from this carrier after further 1995–1996 deck modifications.

== Ships in class ==
Ship	Builder	Namesake	Laid down	Launched	Commissioned	Decommissioned	Fate
Clemenceau	Arsenal de Brest	Georges Clemenceau	November 1955	21 December 1957	2 November 1961	1 October 1997	Broken up at Hartlepool, 2009
Foch	Chantiers de l'Atlantique, Saint-Nazaire	Maréchal Ferdinand Foch	15 November 1957	23 July 1960	15 July 1963	15 November 2000	Sold to Brazilian Navy as São Paulo, November 2000. Out of Service 14 February 2017. Scuttled 3 February 2023.

- Clemenceau, lead ship of the class, was laid down in 1955, launched in 1957, and commissioned in 1961. She served in numerous roles with the French Navy alongside Foch for 36 years until finally decommissioned in 1997. After the end of her service she became embroiled in controversy over her disposal. She was dismantled and recycled by Able UK at Graythorp on Teesside, England.
- Foch followed "le Clem" by about two years in building, and served slightly longer than the lead ship, from 1963 to 2000. She was then transferred to the Brazilian Navy where she continued to serve as São Paulo until 2017. She was sold for scrap to a Turkish firm in 2022, but after plans to scrap her in Turkey fell through because of issues relating to the ship's asbestos pollution, the Brazilian Navy scuttled her in the Atlantic.

== General arrangement ==
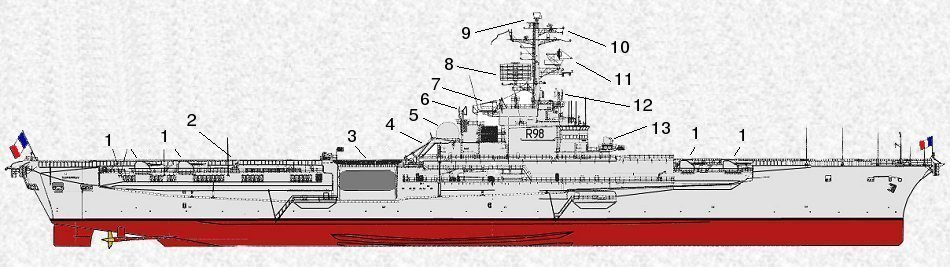
1 : 100mm cannon; 2 : Weapons control radar type DRBC-31; 3 : Aircraft lift; 4 : 15 tonne crane; 5 : Aircraft approach radar type NRBA-50; 6 : Altitude radar type DRBI-10; 7 : Funnel; 8 : Proximity radar type DRBV-20; 9 : TACAN Antenna; 10 : Combined low altitude and surface-to-air radar type DRBV-50; 11 : Proximity radar type DRBV-23; 12 : Altitude radar type DRBI-10; 13 : Weapons control radar type DRBC-31

== See also ==
- French aircraft carrier Verdun
