= French aircraft carrier Clemenceau =

French aircraft carrier, lead ship of her class

Clemenceau
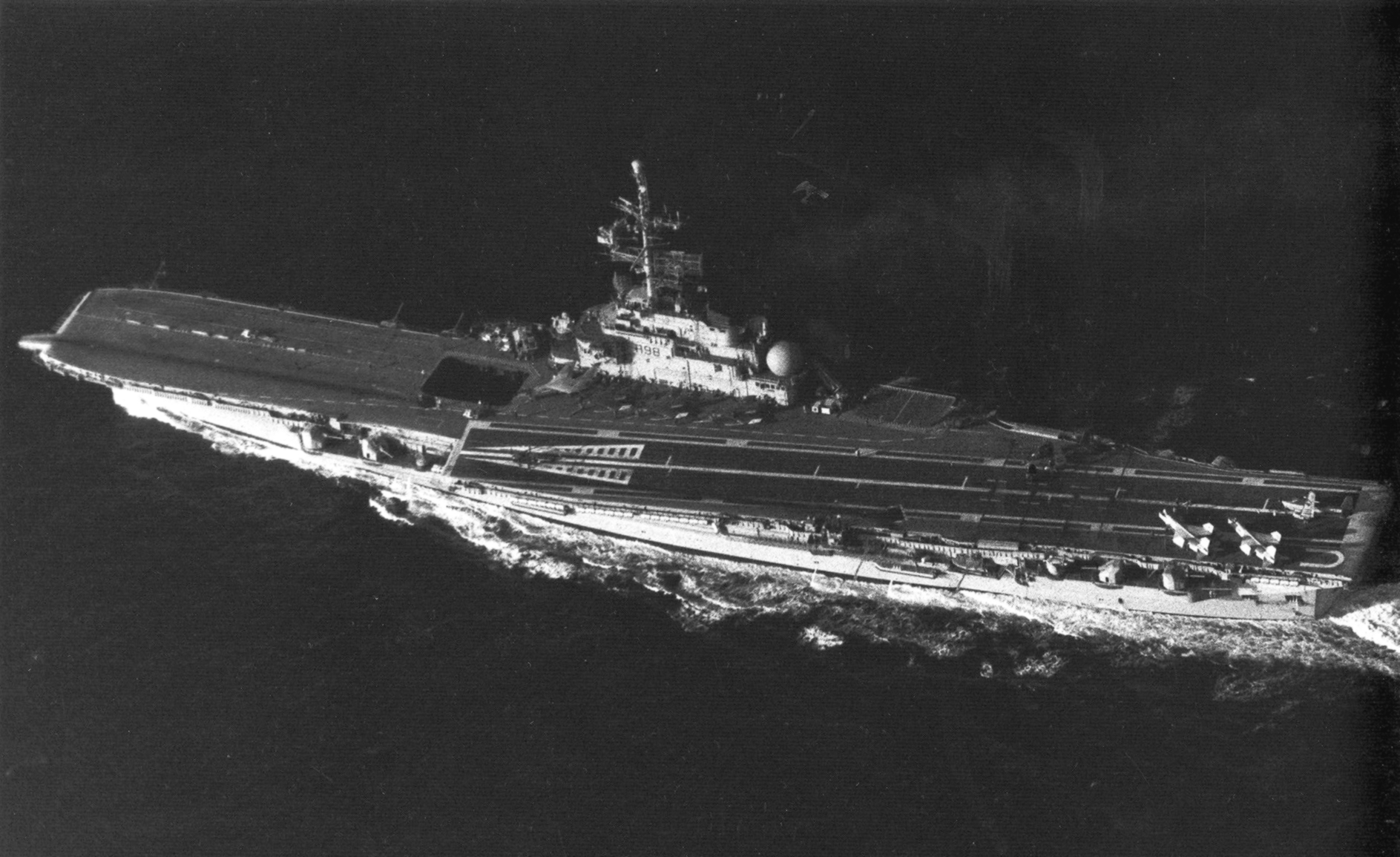
- Clemenceau under way in 1981

History

France
- Name: Clemenceau
- Namesake: Georges Clemenceau
- Builder: Brest shipyard
- Laid down: November 1955
- Launched: 21 December 1957
- Commissioned: 22 November 1961
- Decommissioned: 1 October 1997
- Home port: Brest
- Identification: R98
- Fate: Scrapped 2009–2010

General characteristics
- Class & type: Clemenceau-class aircraft carrier
- Displacement: 22,000 tons (standard); 32,780 tons (loaded)
- Length: 265 m (869 ft 5 in)
- Beam: 51.2 m (168 ft 0 in)
- Draught: 8.6 m (28 ft 3 in)
- Installed power: 6 Indret boilers; 126,000 shp (94,000 kW)
- Propulsion: 4 steam turbines
- Speed: 32 knots (59 km/h; 37 mph)
- Capacity: 582 air group personnel
- Complement: 1,338 (aircraft carrier); 984 (helicopter carrier)
- Sensors & processing systems: 1 DRBV-23B air sentry radar; 1 DRBV-50 low altitude or surface sentry radar (later replaced by a DRBV-15); 1 NRBA-50 approach radar; 2 DRBI-10 tri-dimensional air sentry radar; Multiple DRBN-34 navigation radars; Multiple DRBC-31 fire direction radars (later replaced by DRBC-32C radars)
- Armament: 8 100 mm turrets (of which 4 replaced in the 1990s by 2 SACP Crotale EDIR systems with 52 missiles); 5 12.7 mm machine guns
- Aircraft carried: Up to 40 aircraft: 15 Super Étendard; 4 Étendard IVP; 8 F-8E(FN) Crusader; 8 Alizé; 2 Dauphin Pedro; 2 Super Frelon

Clemenceau (French pronunciation: [klemɑ̃so]) was the French Navy's sixth aircraft carrier and the lead ship of her class. The carrier served from 1961 to 1997 and was dismantled and recycled in 2009. The carrier was the second French warship to be named after Georges Clemenceau, the first being a Richelieu-class battleship laid down in 1939 but never finished.

Clemenceau and her sister ship Foch served as the mainstays of the French fleet. During the carrier's career, Clemenceau sailed more than 1,000,000 nautical miles (1,900,000 km; 1,200,000 mi) during 3,125 days at sea. She was equipped to handle nuclear munitions to be delivered by her air complement and was later modified to fire nuclear-capable missiles. She took part in numerous exercises and cruises, seeing action during the Lebanese Civil War and Gulf War and in air operations over the former Yugoslavia.

== Description ==
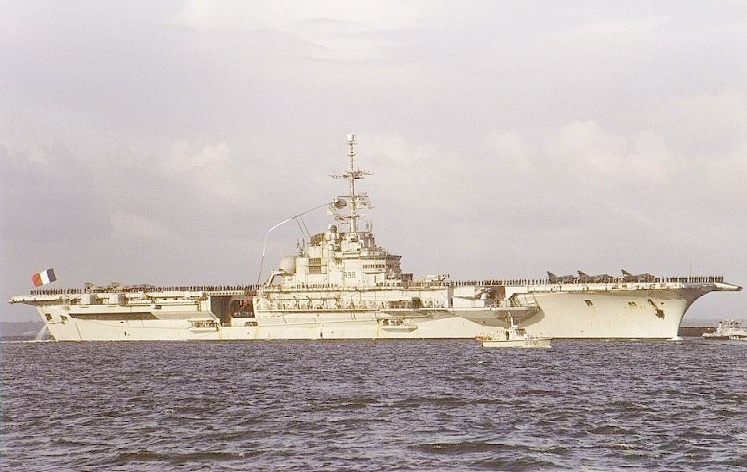
Clemenceau arrives in Brest at the end of her final cruise in 1997

The development of Clemenceau represented France's effort to produce its own class of multi-role aircraft carriers to replace the American and British ships provided at the end of World War II. The ship had a small but effective design, using some of the elements of United States carriers, but on a smaller scale. The vessels were given relatively heavy gun armament for their size, and some stability problems were encountered which required bulging the hull.

The Clemenceau-class aircraft carriers were of conventional CATOBAR design. The landing area was 165.5 m (543 ft 0 in) long by 29.5 m (96 ft 9 in) wide; it was angled at 8 degrees off of the ship's axis. The flight deck is 265 m (869 ft 5 in) long. The forward aircraft elevator was to starboard, and the rear elevator was positioned on the deck edge to save hangar space. The forward of two 52 m (171 ft) catapults was at the bow to port, the aft catapult was on the angled landing deck. The hangar deck dimensions were 152 m (498 ft 8 in) by 22–24 m (72 ft 2 in – 78 ft 9 in) with 7 m (23 ft 0 in) overhead.

Clemenceau went through a major refit from September 1977 to November 1978. She was refitted again with new defensive systems from 1 September 1985 to 31 August 1987, this included the replacement of four of the 100 mm guns with a pair of Crotale surface-to-air missile launchers. She was modified in 1978 to enable her aircraft to deliver several AN 52 bombs. In 1993 she was modified again to take nuclear capable Air-Sol Moyenne Portée missiles.

== History ==
=== Career ===
Throughout the course of the aircraft carrier's lengthy career, it participated in the majority of French naval operations. From 12 January to 5 February 1962, Clemenceau participated in a NATO exercise known as BigGame with the United States Sixth Fleet in the western Mediterranean as an anti-submarine aircraft carrier. This was followed from 9 March to 2 April with another NATO exercise called OTAN Dawn Breeze VII, in the Gibraltar zone.

In January 1968, Clemenceau participated in the search for the lost submarine Minerve in the Mediterranean when contact was lost 25 nautical miles (46 km; 29 mi) from port at Toulon. Minerve remained lost until French Defence Minister Florence Parly announced on 22 July 2019 that the wreck had been discovered.

During the same year, the carrier was deployed to the south Pacific for French nuclear bomb testing in Polynesia including Canopus, the first French hydrogen bomb. With the deployment of the fleet, codenamed Alfa Force (French: Force Alfa), the naval force present around two atolls represented more than 40% of the tonnage of the entire French navy. Clemenceau was the flagship of a fleet composed of forty ships.

During 1974–1977 Clemenceau was deployed off the African coast in the Indian Ocean in Operation Saphir I and Operation Saphir II in support of newly independent Djibouti. During the Lebanese Civil War Clemenceau was deployed in the East Mediterranean in 1983–84. The carrier rotated with Foch, providing constant on-station air support to French peacekeepers in the Multinational Force in Lebanon FSMB and the United Nations Interim Force in Lebanon UNIFIL. The carrier's main support engagement was in Operation Olifant. In 1987–1988 she participated in Operation Prométhée in the Gulf of Oman during the war between Iraq and Iran. The Promethée battle force (Task Force 623), included Clemenceau, the mine counter-measures support ship Loire, and Durance-class tankers Meuse, Var, and Marne. In 1990, escorted by the cruiser Colbert and the tanker Var, she transported 40 helicopters (SA-341F/ -342 Gazelles, SA-330 Pumas), three Br-1050 Alizés and trucks to Iraq during Operations Desert Shield and Desert Storm. The carrier was mainly engaged in Operation Salamandre in the Red Sea and the Arabian Sea during the conflict between Iraq and Kuwait. During 1993 to 1996 Clemenceau completed several tours including combat operations and air patrol over the former Yugoslavia in Operation Balbuzard (French: Opération Balbuzard) in order to support the UN's troops, then Salamandre in the Adriatic Sea during the Yugoslav Wars.

Clemenceau operated around the world with a career total of more than one million nautical miles traveled, the equivalent of circumnavigating the globe 48 times. The carrier passed 3,125 days at sea, with 80,000 hours of function, and conducted more than 70,000 catapult-launches.

In 1983, the bâtiment was the first unit of the French Navy to embark female personnel. Three women were assigned on board: one maître principal, one secrétaire militaire and one premier maître.

Loyal to the tradition of the French Navy, Clemenceau welcomed on board numerous fine art painters, some for a week and others for up to two months.

=== Disposal ===
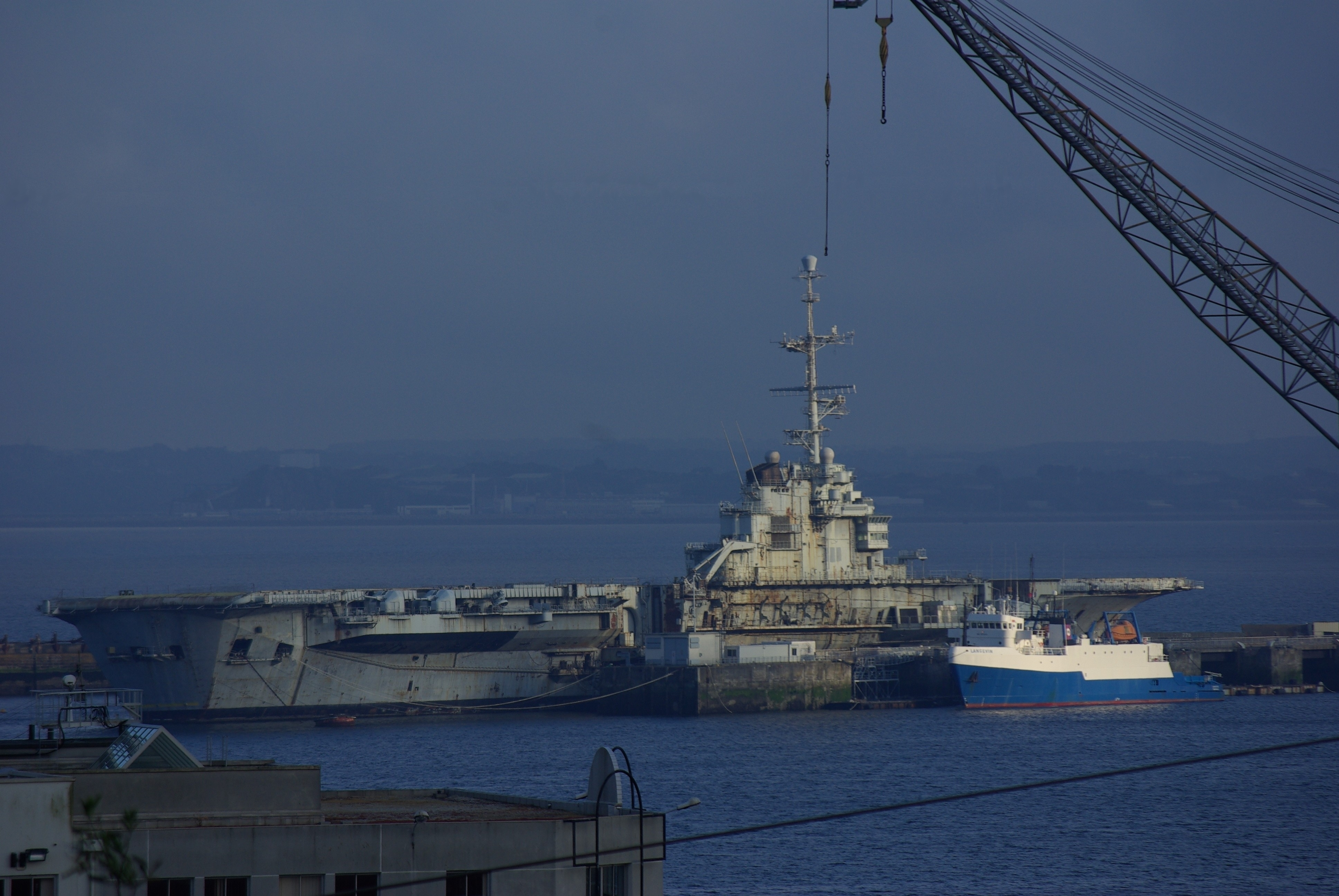
Clemenceau in Brest in 2008 prior to being taken for disposal

On 31 December 2005, Clemenceau left Toulon to be dismantled in Alang, India despite protests about improper disposal and a lack of facilities for the management of toxic waste.

On 6 January 2006, the Supreme Court of India temporarily denied access to Alang. After having been boarded by activists, held by Egyptian authorities, and then transiting the Suez Canal on 15 January, a court ruling by the Conseil d'État ordered Clemenceau to return to French waters. Able UK, based at the Graythorp yard near Hartlepool received a disassembly contract to use accepted practices in scrapping the ship. The dismantling started on 18 November 2009 and the break-up was completed by the end of 2010.

== General arrangement ==
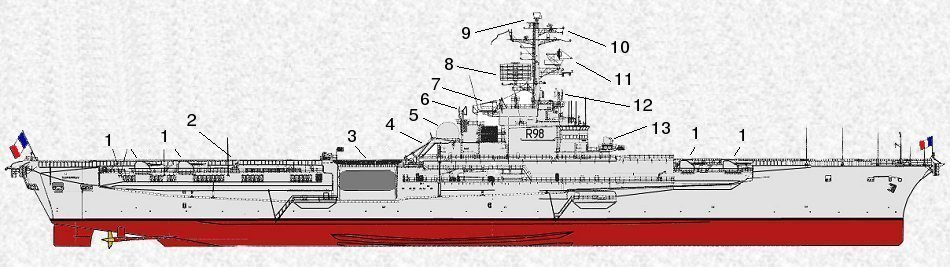
1 : 100mm cannon; 2 : Weapons control radar type DRBC-31; 3 : Aircraft lift; 4 : 15 tonne crane; 5 : Aircraft approach radar type NRBA-50; 6 : Altitude radar type DRBI-10; 7 : Funnel; 8 : Proximity radar type DRBV-20; 9 : TACAN Antenna; 10 : Combined low altitude and surface-to-air radar type DRBV-50; 11 : Proximity radar type DRBV-23; 12 : Altitude radar type DRBI-10; 13 : Weapons control radar type DRBC-31

== In popular culture ==
- A 1985 television commercial for the Citroën Visa GTI car was shot aboard Clemenceau. A race pits the car against a Dassault Étendard IV; both continue off the end of the carrier, with the small automobile briefly keeping pace with the aircraft before plummeting into the ocean. Seconds later, though, the car triumphantly emerges, perched on the foredeck of a surfacing Agosta-class submarine.

== Gallery ==
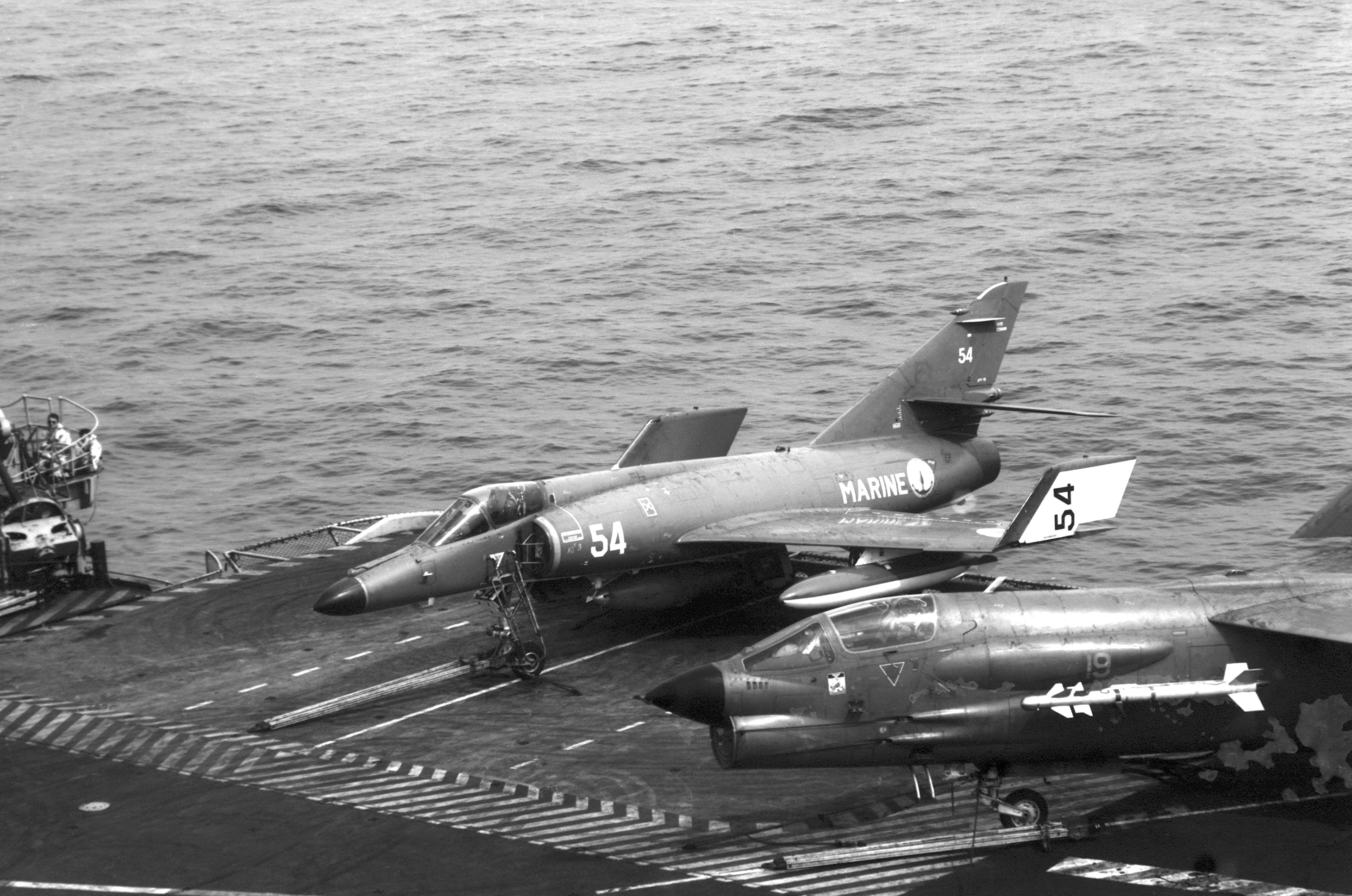
A Super Étendard and a Crusader aboard Clemenceau in 1988.

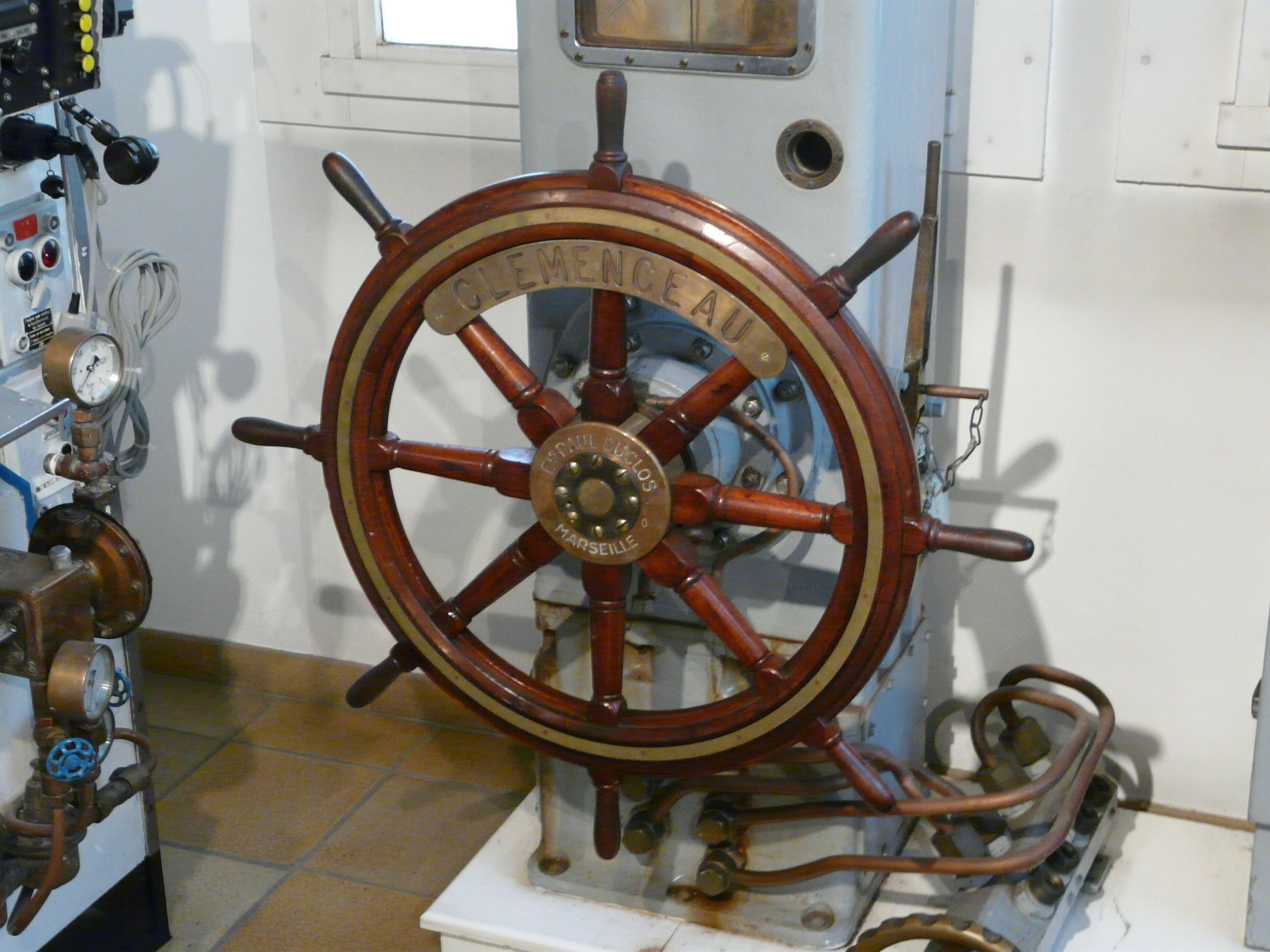
Clemenceau's ship's wheel

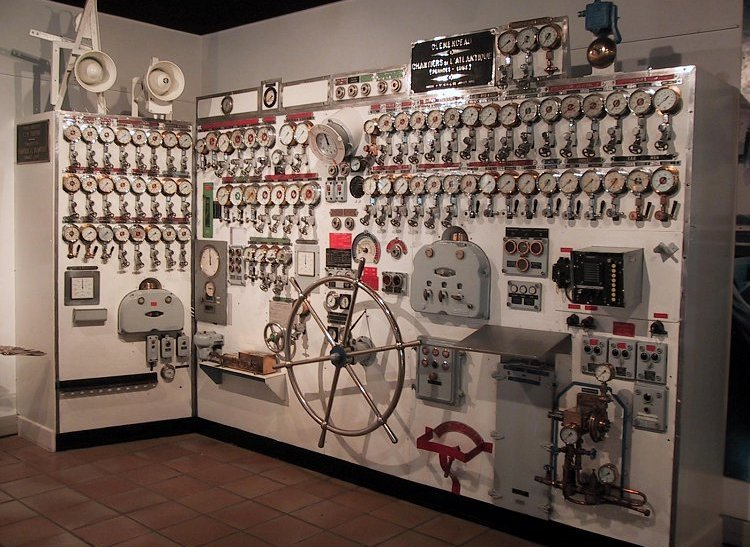
The control board of one of the propulsion machines

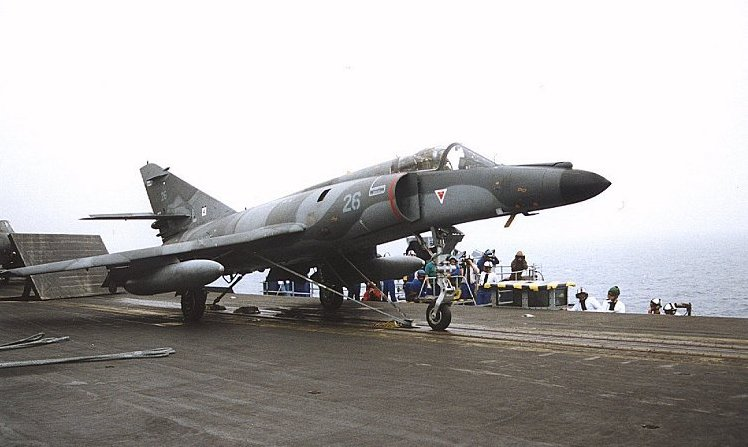
Super Étendard in catapult (16 July 1997)

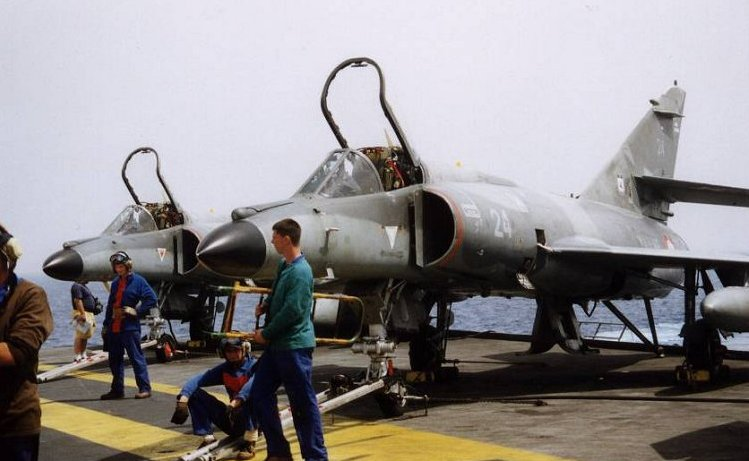
Super Étendard on the catapult deck

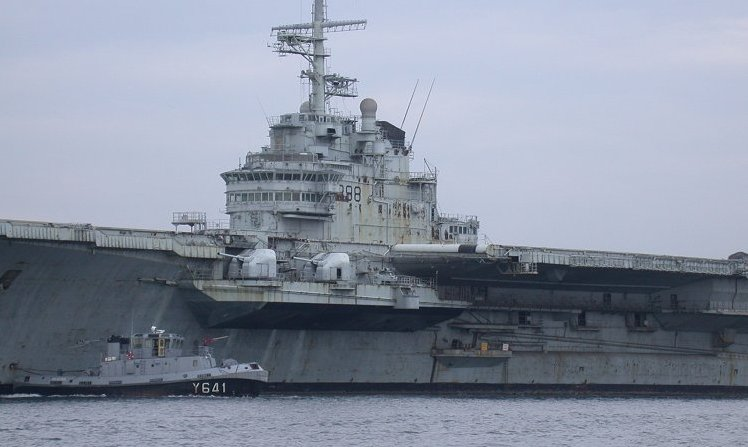
Gun and turret

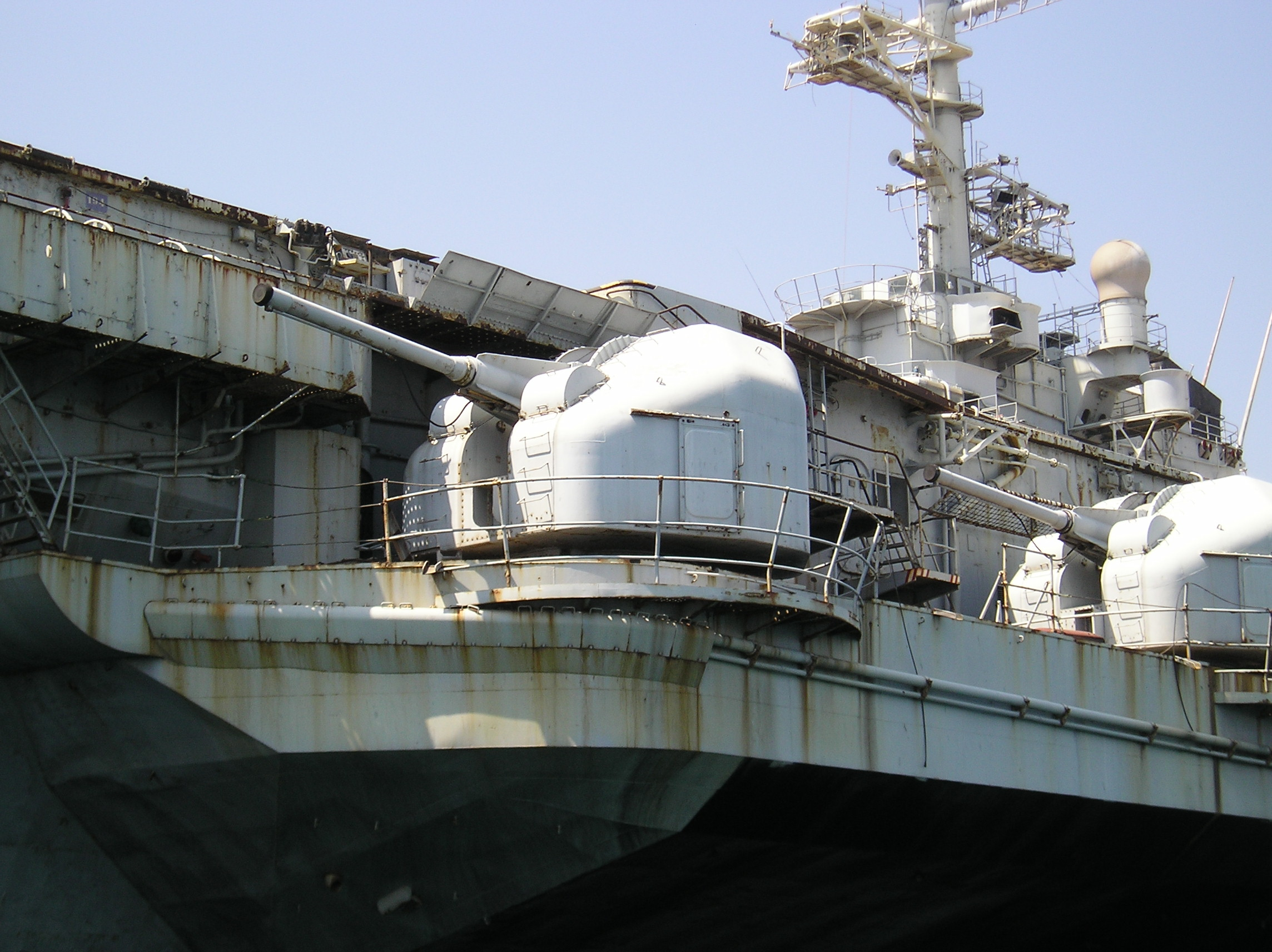
Turret

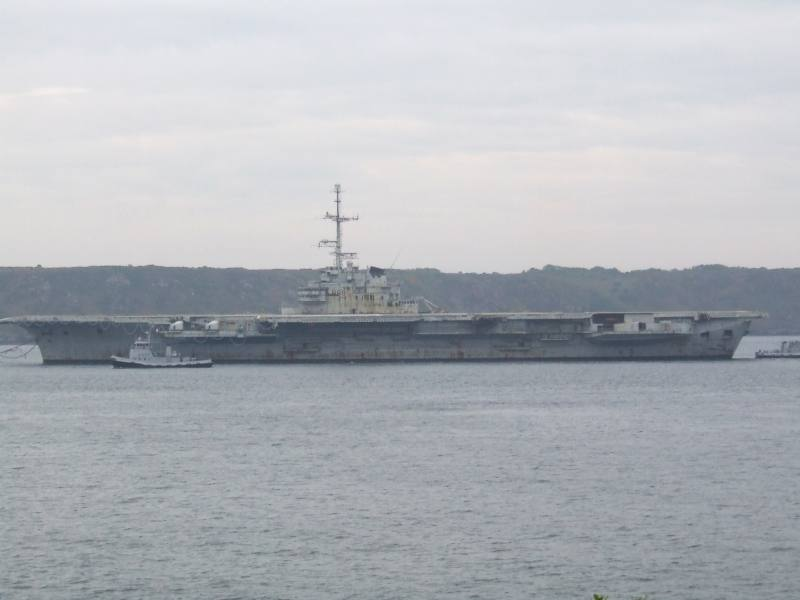

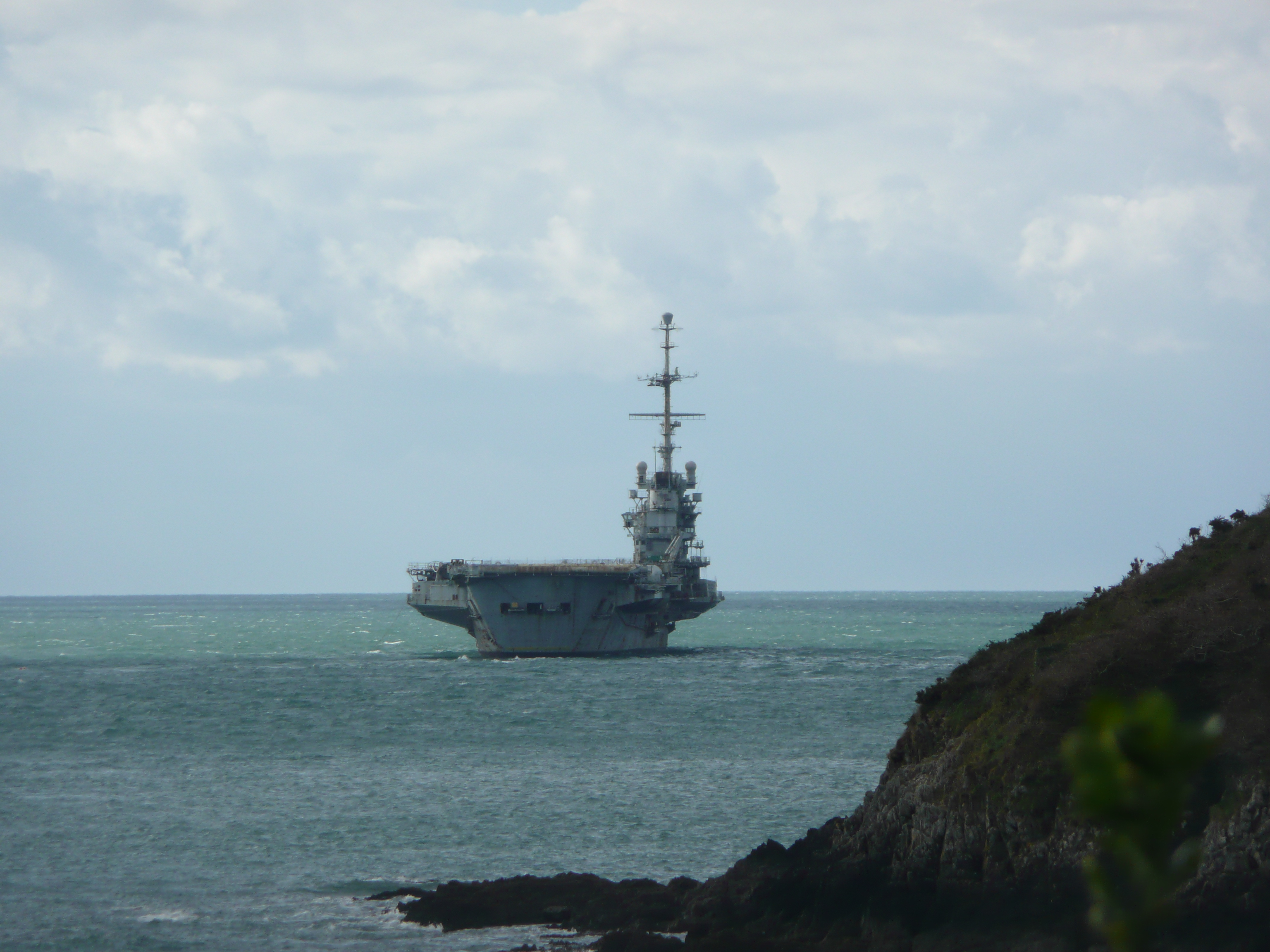
Departure for a voyage

== Bibliography ==
- Warship International Staff (1986). "Question 27/84". Warship International. XXIII (3): 318. ISSN 0043-0374.
