= French aircraft carrier Foch =

French Clemenceau-class aircraft carrier

Foch
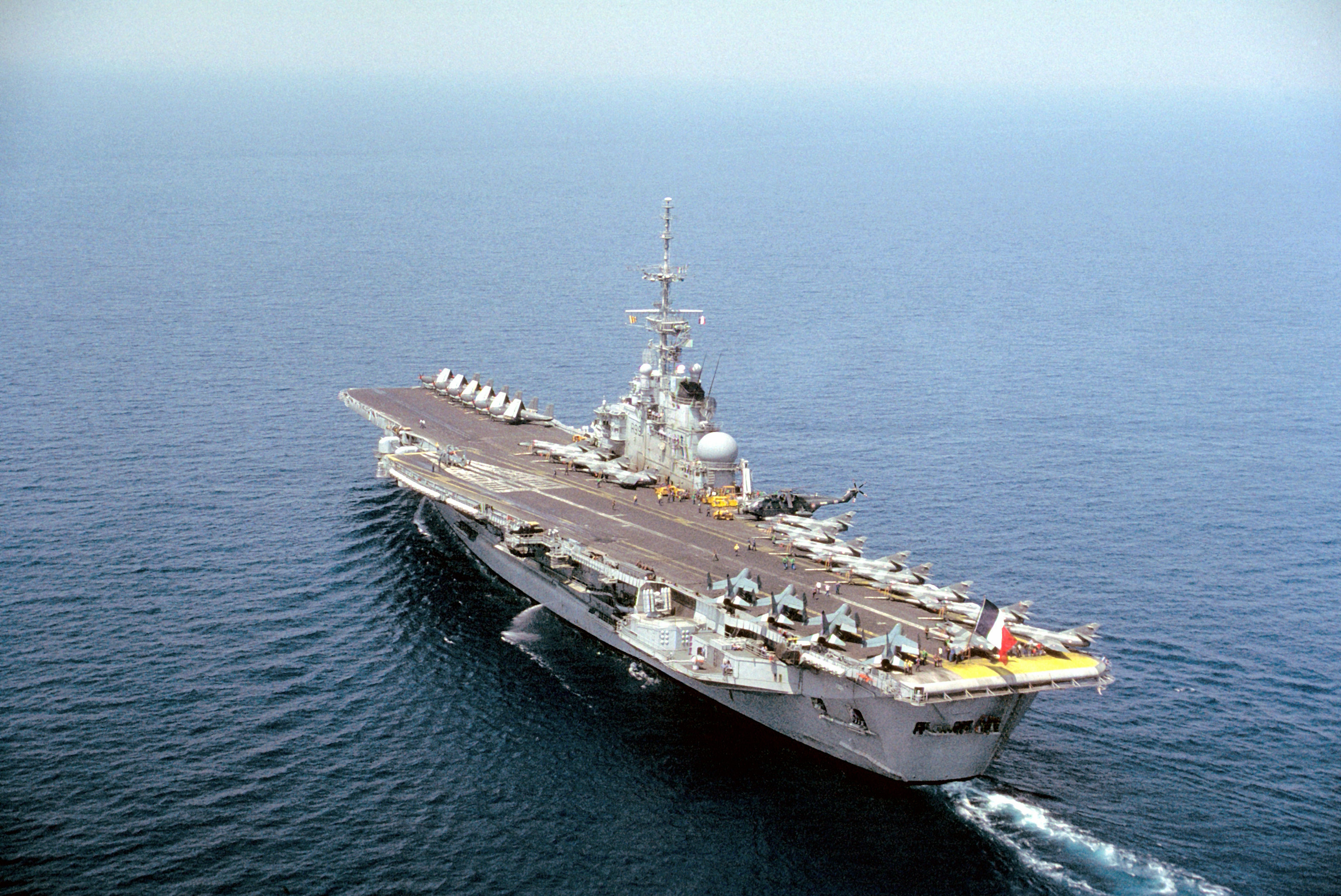
- A port quarter view of Foch underway during exercise Dragon Hammer '92

History

France
- Name: Foch
- Namesake: Ferdinand Foch
- Ordered: 1955
- Laid down: 15 November 1957
- Launched: 18 July 1959
- Commissioned: 15 July 1963
- Decommissioned: 15 November 2000
- Identification: Pennant number: R99
- Fate: Sold to the Brazilian Navy
- Notes: See NAe São Paulo for subsequent history

General characteristics
- Class & type: Clemenceau-class aircraft carrier
- Displacement: 24,200 t (23,818 long tons) (standard)
- Length: 265 m (869 ft 5 in)
- Beam: 51.2 m (168 ft 0 in)
- Draught: 8.6 m (28 ft 3 in)
- Installed power: 6 × Indret boilers; 126,000 shp (94,000 kW)
- Propulsion: 2 shafts; 4 × steam turbines
- Speed: 32 knots (59 km/h; 37 mph)
- Range: 7,500 nmi (13,900 km; 8,600 mi) at 18 knots (33 km/h; 21 mph)
- Complement: 1,338
- Sensors & processing systems: 1 × DRBV-23B air search radar; 1 × DRBV-50 low-altitude or surface search radar (later replaced by a DRBV-15); 1 × NRBA-50 approach radar; 1 × DRBI-10 tri-dimensional air search radar; Several DRBC-31 fire-control radar (later DRBC-32C); DRBN-34 navigation radars
- Armament: 8 × 100 mm turrets (originally); in the 1990s, 4 were replaced by 2 × SACP Crotale EDIR systems, with 52 missiles; 5 × 12.7 mm machine guns • 2 × Sadral launchers for 6 Mistral missiles each (added in 1994)
- Aircraft carried: About 40 aircraft: 15 × Super Étendard; 4 × Étendard IVP; 10 × F-8E (FN) Crusader; 6 × Alizé; 2 × Dauphin Pedro helicopters; 2 × Super Frelon helicopters

Foch (French pronunciation: [fɔʃ]) was the second Clemenceau-class aircraft carrier that served with the French Navy from 1963 to 2000. The carrier was the second warship named in honour of the Marshal of France, British Field Marshal and Marshal of Poland Ferdinand Foch. (Note: Ferdinand Foch said in 1911, "Airplanes are interesting toys but of no military value" although this was only eight years after the first powered-human flight.)

After serving with the French Navy, the vessel was sold to Brazil and renamed São Paulo. The Brazilian Navy scuttled her on 3 February 2023 in the Atlantic Ocean.

== Design ==
The Clemenceau-class aircraft carriers, of which Foch was the last surviving member, were of conventional CATOBAR design. The landing area was 165.5 metres (543 ft 0 in) long by 29.5 metres (96 ft 9 in) wide; it was angled at 8 degrees off of the ship's axis. The flight deck was 265 metres (869 ft 5 in) long. The forward aircraft elevator was to starboard, and the rear elevator was positioned on the deck edge to save hangar space. The forward of two 52-metre (171 ft) catapults were at the bow to port, the aft catapult was on the forward area of angled landing deck. The hangar deck dimensions are 152 by 22–24 metres (499 by 72–79 ft) with 7 metres (23 ft) overhead.

== History ==
The draft statute, prepared by the Naval General Staff in 1949, asked for four aircraft carriers of 20,000 tons to be available in two phases. At its meeting of 22 August 1949, the Supreme Council of the Navy was even more ambitious, where they proposed a six aircraft carrier fleet. On 15 July 1952, the French Navy still wanted two to five for the French Navy (not available to NATO). According to RCM 12, the final document of the Lisbon Conference of 1952, France should make available to NATO an aircraft carrier on D-day, two on day 30, three on day 180. In 1953, the Navy had to revise its ambitions downwards, with a target of three aircraft carriers.

The PA 54 Clemenceau, budgeted in 1953, was delayed until November 1955, the PA 55 Foch, budgeted for 1955, was delayed until February 1957. Between 1980 and 1981, she underwent a study to certify the platform before catapulting aircraft, carrying missiles, bombs, AM-39 Exocet and tactical nuclear bombs. Like her sister ship Clemenceau, Foch underwent a modernization and refit, replacing four of her eight 100-millimetre (3.9 in) guns with two Crotale air-defense systems. Unlike Clemenceau, Foch also received in 1997 two Sadral launchers (for 6 Mistral missiles each); those launchers were purchased by France in 1994.

The Dassault Rafale was test flown from Foch (but not Clemenceau) after deck modifications in 1992 and operated from this carrier after further 1995–96 deck modifications.

After a 37-year career in the French Navy, on 15 November 2000, the carrier was sold to the Brazilian Navy, and renamed Brazilian aircraft carrier São Paulo. In the French Navy, she was succeeded by Charles de Gaulle.

== Principal operations ==
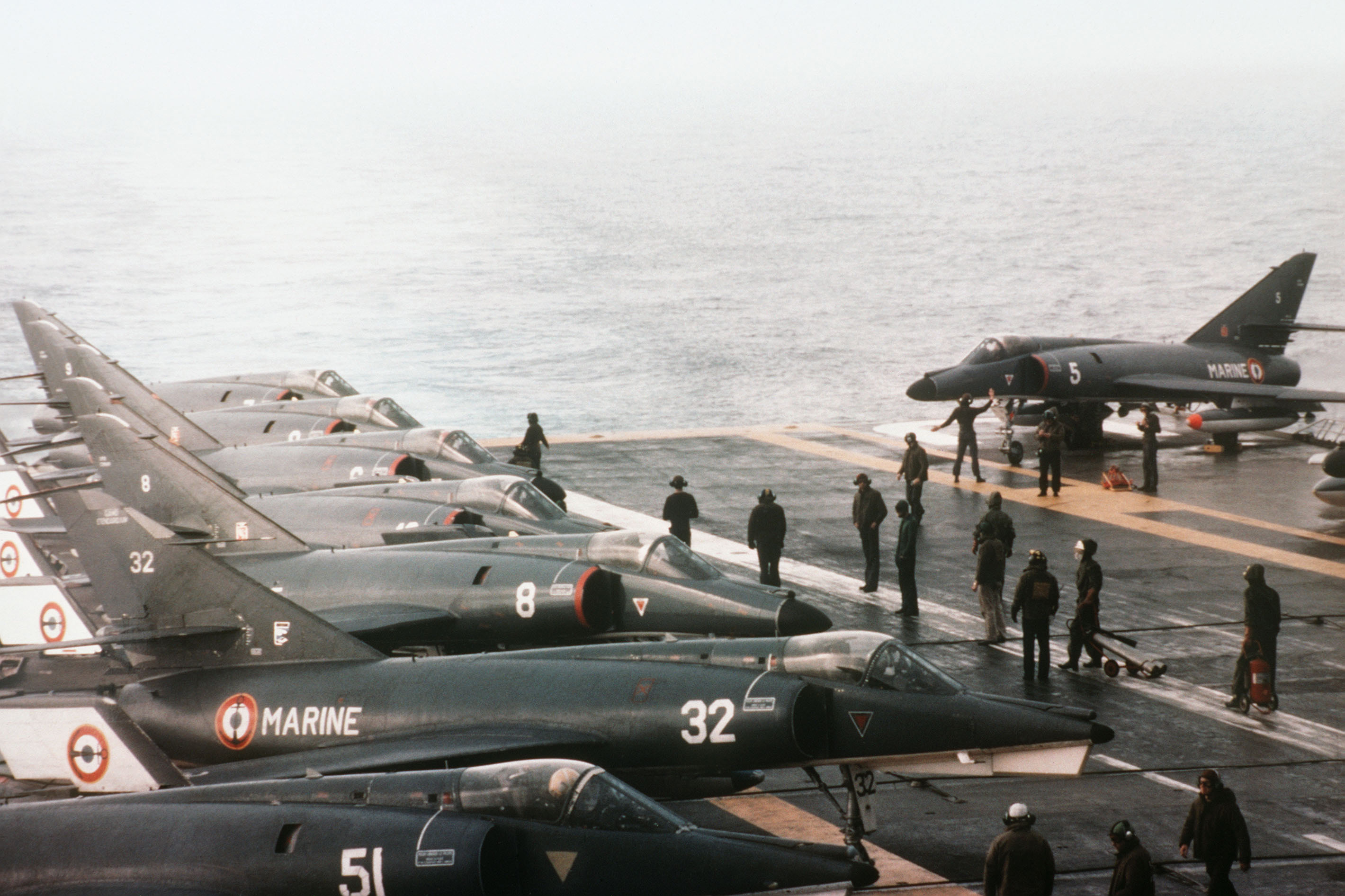
Six Aéronavale Dassault Super Étendard and two Étendard IVM (foreground) fighters aboard Foch off the coast of Lebanon, in 1983.

Main naval operations for the époque were conducted by sister ship Clemenceau. Foch was engaged in the following:

- 1966: Foch participated, with Alfa Force (French: Force Alfa), to the campaign of French nuclear experimentation in the Pacific.
- 1978 : during the Independence of Djibouti, Foch deployed in the Red Sea in Operation Saphir II.
- 1983 : Foch participated to the support of the French contingent deployed in Lebanon within the cadre of the Operation Olifant missions. The carrier would rotate with Clemenceau providing constant on station air support to French peacekeepers in the Multinational Force in Lebanon FSMB and the United Nations Interim Force in Lebanon UNIFIL.
- 1993–1999 : Foch was regularly engaged in Operations Balbuzard, Salamandre and Trident in the Adriatic Sea during the engagement of France in ex-Yugoslavia within the cadre of FORPRONU and the SFOR and KFOR. The carrier ensured the security of French elements deployed on the ground, and conducted aerial raids under the command of the United Nations and NATO.

=== Combat history ===
In 1977 F-8 Crusaders from 14.F squadron from Foch participated in the Saphir missions over Djibouti. On 7 May 1977, two Crusaders went separately on patrol against what were supposedly French Air Force (4/11 Jura squadron) F-100 Super Sabres stationed at Djibouti. The leader intercepted two fighters and initiated a dogfight as part of the training exercise, but quickly called his wingman for help as he had actually engaged two Yemeni MiG-21 Fishbeds. The two French fighters switched their master armament to "on" but, ultimately, everyone returned to their bases. This was the only combat interception by French Crusaders.

In October 1984, France sent Foch for Operation Mirmillon off the coast of Libya, in response to tension in the Gulf of Sidra.

She was involved in the Yugoslav Wars between July and August 1993, in February and March 1994, and in February and from May to July 1994 in support of UN operations. She also was part of NATO's Allied force operations with Super Étendards flying strike missions over Serbia in 1999. She was forced to withdraw early four months into her deployment, the longest in her service history, due to problems with her catapult system and other issues.

In 2000, Foch made her last deployment by leading Task Force 473 on a four month around-the-world tour.

== In fiction ==
Foch was featured prominently in the 1995 film Crimson Tide as the setting for several televised news reports by American journalist Richard Valeriani (playing himself in the film) about the ongoing conflict in Russia. Foch was used in this role after the U.S. Navy refused to assist in the film's production, thus removing the possibility of filming on board a U.S. carrier.

== Gallery ==
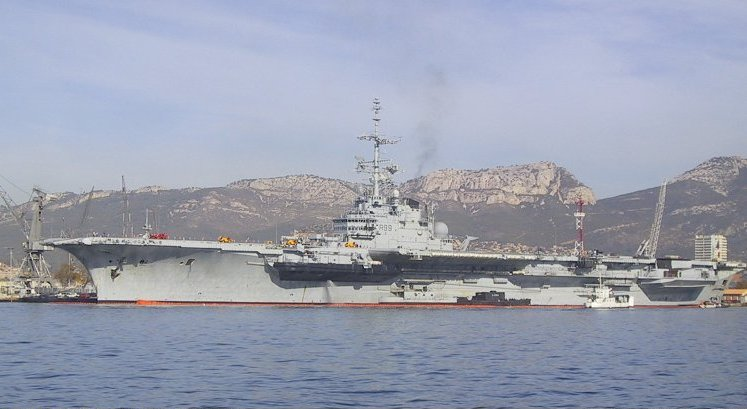

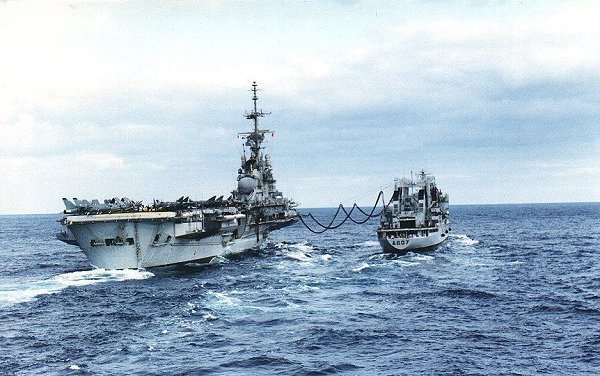
Meuse refueling Foch

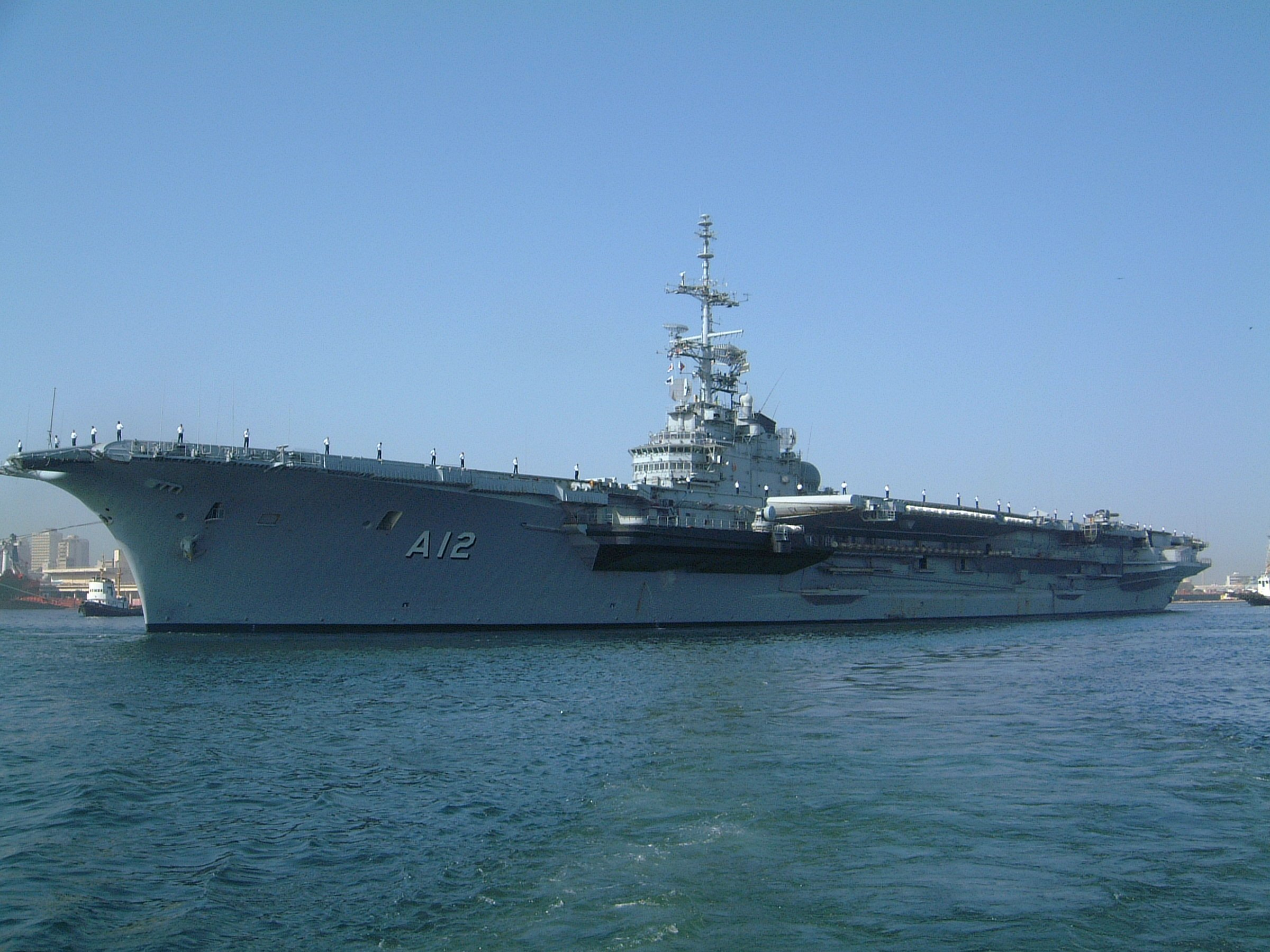
São Paulo, ex-Foch

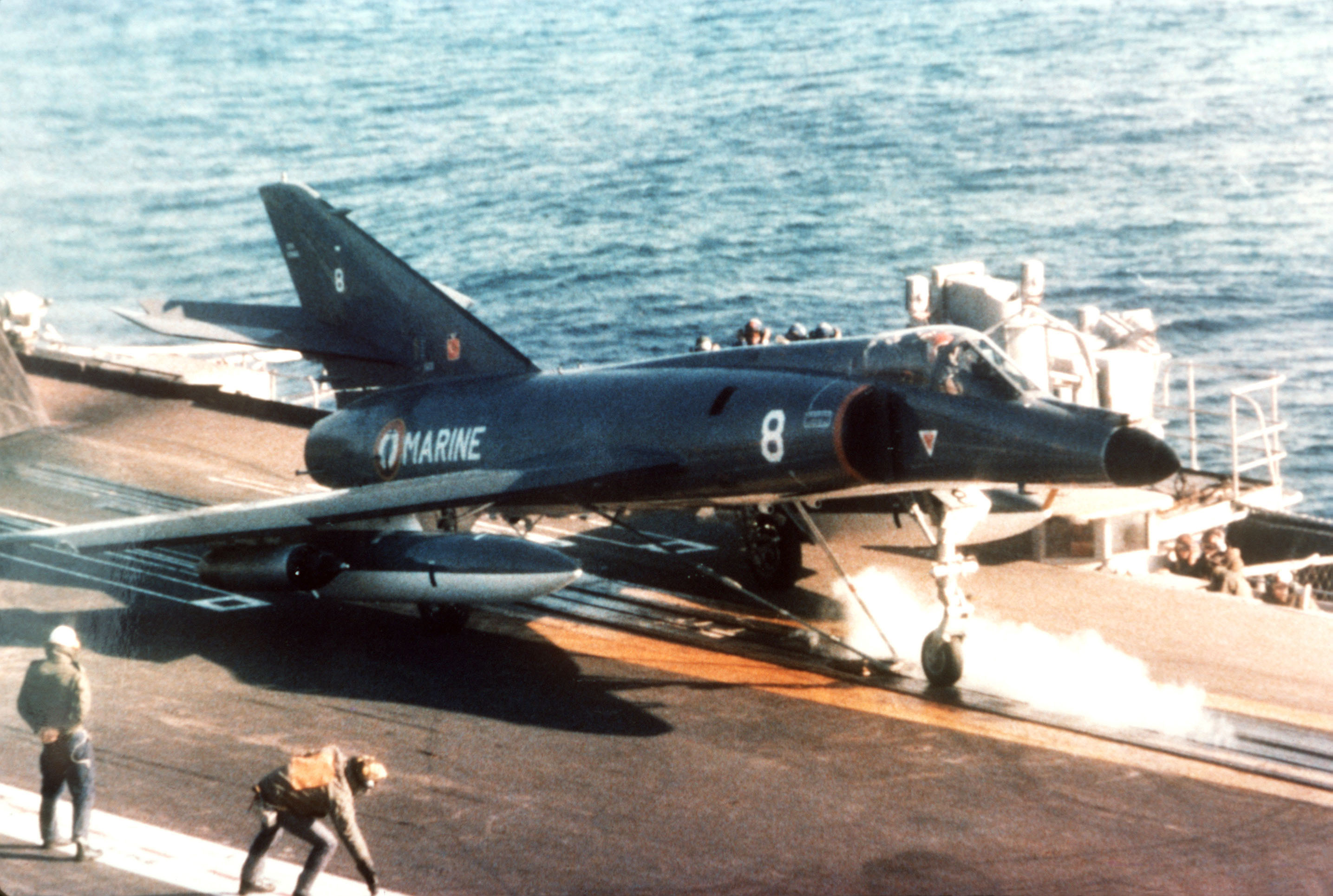
Super Étendard ready to be launched from Foch during the ship's 1983 deployment to Lebanon

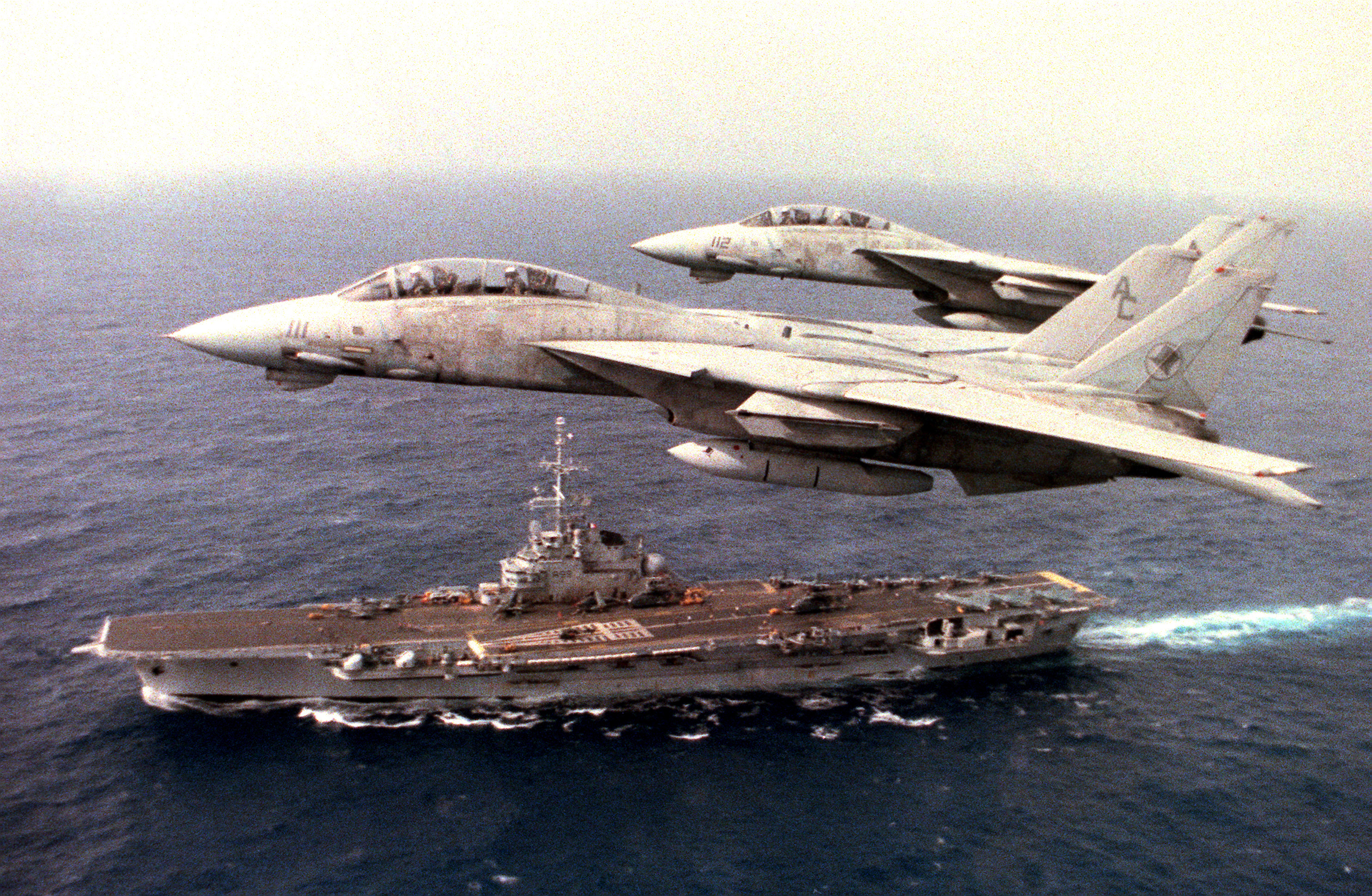
F-14 Tomcats overfly Foch in 1990 during an exercise.

== Bibliography ==
- Warship International Staff (1986). "Question 27/84". Warship International. XXIII (3): 318. ISSN 0043-0374.

== Sources ==
- Boniface, Patrick (September 2015), "Clemenceau carriers", Ships Monthly: 46–49
- Jordan, John & Moulin, Jean (2025). French Aircraft Carriers, 1910-2000. Naval Institute Press. ISBN 978-1-68247-790-8.
- Moulin, Jean (2020). Tous les porte-aéronefs en France: de 1912 à nos jours [All the Aircraft Carriers of France: From 1912 to Today]. Collection Navires et Histoire des Marines du Mond (in French). Vol. 35. Le Vigen, France: Lela Presse. ISBN 978-2-37468-035-4.
- Moulin, Jean & Jordan, John (2023). "Clemenceau and Foch: France's First Modern Aircraft Carriers". In Jordan, John (ed.). Warship 2023. Oxford: Osprey Publishing. pp. 26–47. ISBN 978-1-4728-5713-2.
