= Vought F-8E(FN) Crusader =

French variant of the F-8 Crusader

F-8E(FN) Crusader
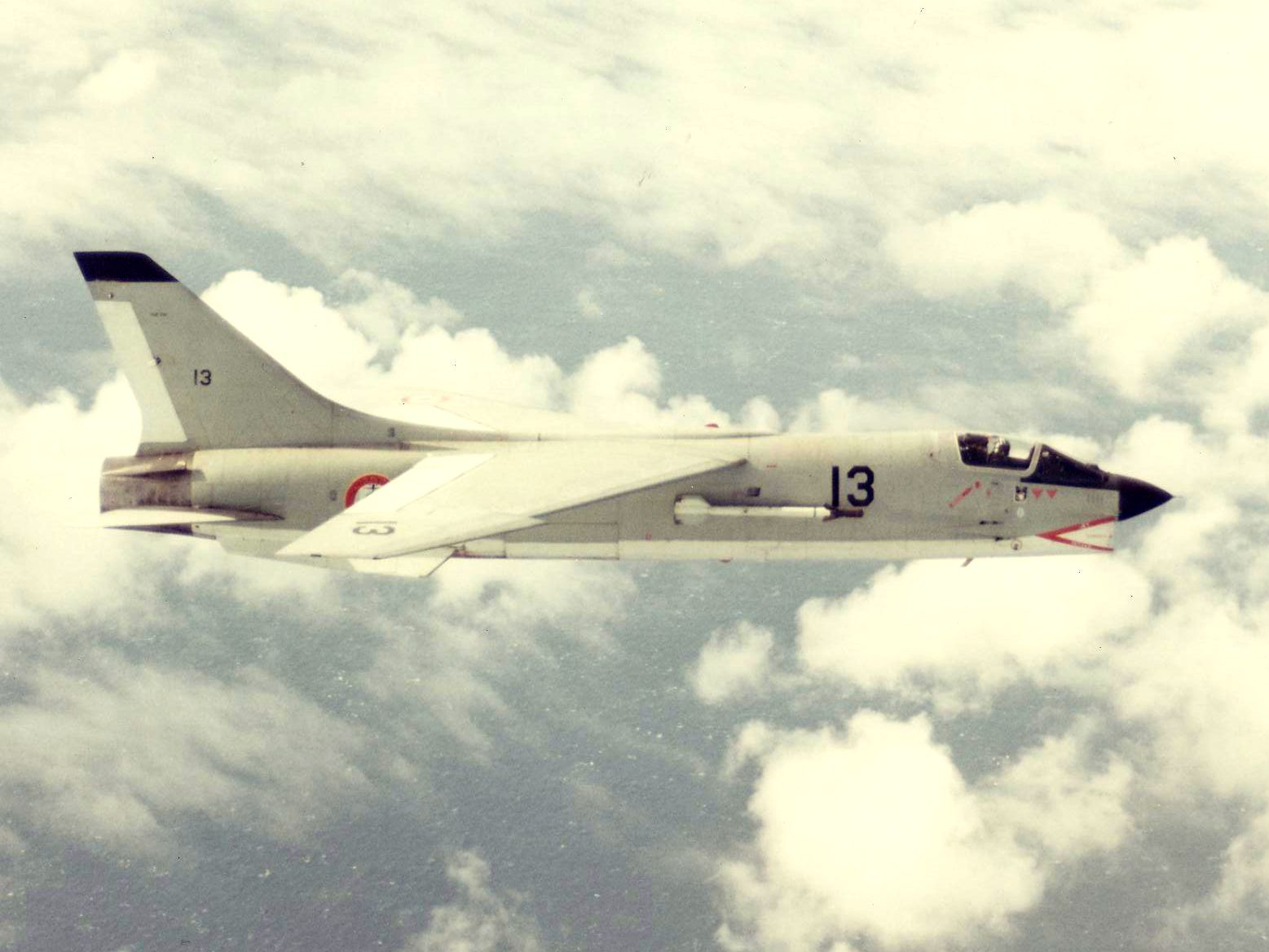
- A French Navy Crusader over the Mediterranean in 1976

General information
- Type: Fleet air defence fighter
- National origin: United States
- Manufacturer: Vought
- Primary user: Aéronavale
- Number built: 42 (plus 1 prototype)
- Serial: 1 − 42 (French Navy); 147036; 151732 – 151773 (BuNo)

History
- Manufactured: 1964–65
- Introduction date: 1 October 1964; 62 years ago
- First flight: 27 February 1964; 62 years ago
- Retired: 15 December 1999; 26 years ago
- Developed from: Vought F-8 Crusader

The F-8E(FN) is a variant of the Vought F-8 Crusader operated exclusively by the French Navy's air arm, the Aéronavale, in the fleet air defence role. The aircraft incorporated a number of design changes from the standard F-8E Crusader that were required to allow its operation from France's aircraft carriers. Entering service in 1964, the Crusader underwent a major upgrade in the late 1980s to allow it to remain in service for another decade while a replacement aircraft was under development. The Crusader was eventually withdrawn in December 1999.

== Background ==
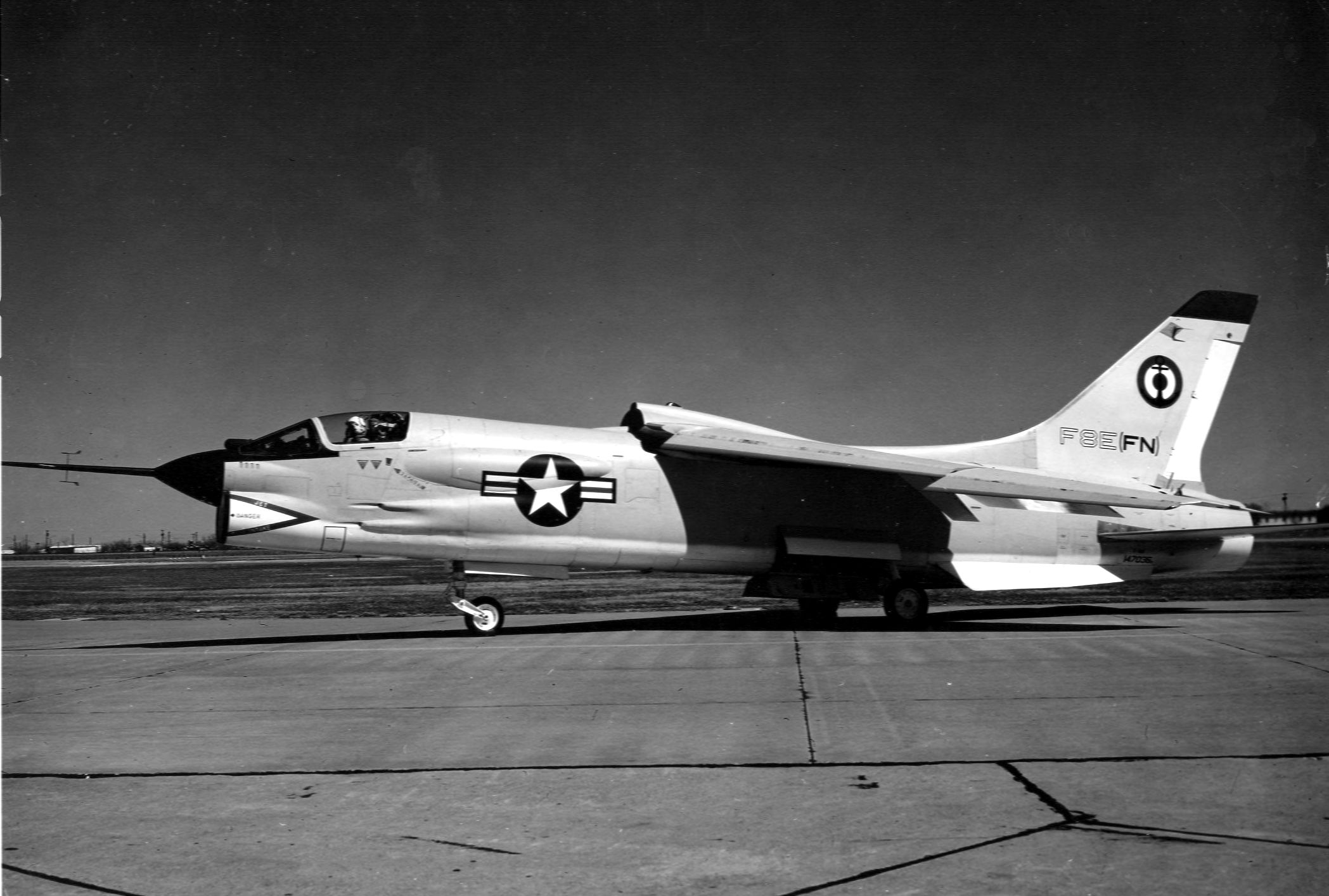
The Prototype F-8E(FN) (BuNo 147036) in February 1964

In the mid-1950s, France's most modern aircraft carrier was Arromanches, a light fleet carrier originally obtained from the United Kingdom. However, the French Navy's carrier fleet was increasingly incapable of operating modern aircraft due to their size. As a result, in order to preserve the country's independence in terms of power projection, two new aircraft carriers were planned. These new ships, which ultimately became the Clemenceau class, would be significantly bigger than Arromanches, and would be able to operate larger and more capable aircraft.

Planned as multi-role strike carriers, the new ships, which were named as Clemenceau and Foch, would operate a modern air group, with the new Dassault Étendard IV, in both its strike and reconnaissance versions, and the Bréguet Alizé for anti-submarine warfare. However, at the time the first ship was commissioned in 1961, France's domestic aviation industry had yet to develop a modern, high-performance, carrier-based interceptor, with Clemenceau's air defence squadron made up of 10 SNCASE Aquilons, a license-built version of the de Havilland Sea Venom. The Aquilon had been in service since 1954 and was rapidly approaching obsolescence, which led to a procurement exercise being undertaken to find a new air defence aircraft to operate from the new carriers. Although French companies did provide proposals, with Breguet offering a concept it called the Sirocco, while Dassault proposed a carrier-based version of the Mirage III, both of these were concepts that would have required time and resources to develop. So, the Navy instead looked at existing designs, with two primarily considered - the McDonnell F-4 Phantom and the Vought F-8 Crusader. Both were in service in the US Navy, but the Phantom, being significantly larger in size, was used in air defence squadrons aboard the large carriers of the Midway, Forrestal, Enterprise and Kitty Hawk classes. The majority of the US carrier fleet was made up of ships of the Essex class, which were a similar size to Clemenceau, and utilised the Crusader as their primary air defence aircraft. The size of the Phantom quickly put it out of the running for operation aboard the new French carriers, and led to the Crusader being selected. In March 1962, a pair of Crusaders from VF-32, a Crusader squadron based aboard USS Saratoga, undertook a series of deck trials aboard Clemenceau to test the aircraft's suitability to operate from the smaller decks of the French ships. The success of these trials led to a contract being signed for the procurement of 40 single-seat Crusaders and 6 two-seaters trainers. However, the two-seat version was cancelled by the US Government, leading to France's order being amended to 42 single-seat aircraft, which proved to be the final Crusaders to be built. Although the Aéronavale assigned their own serial numbers, because the order was added to the tail end of the final order for the US Navy, the Crusaders being built for the French were also assigned Bureau of Aeronautics designating numbers (BuNo).

== Design ==
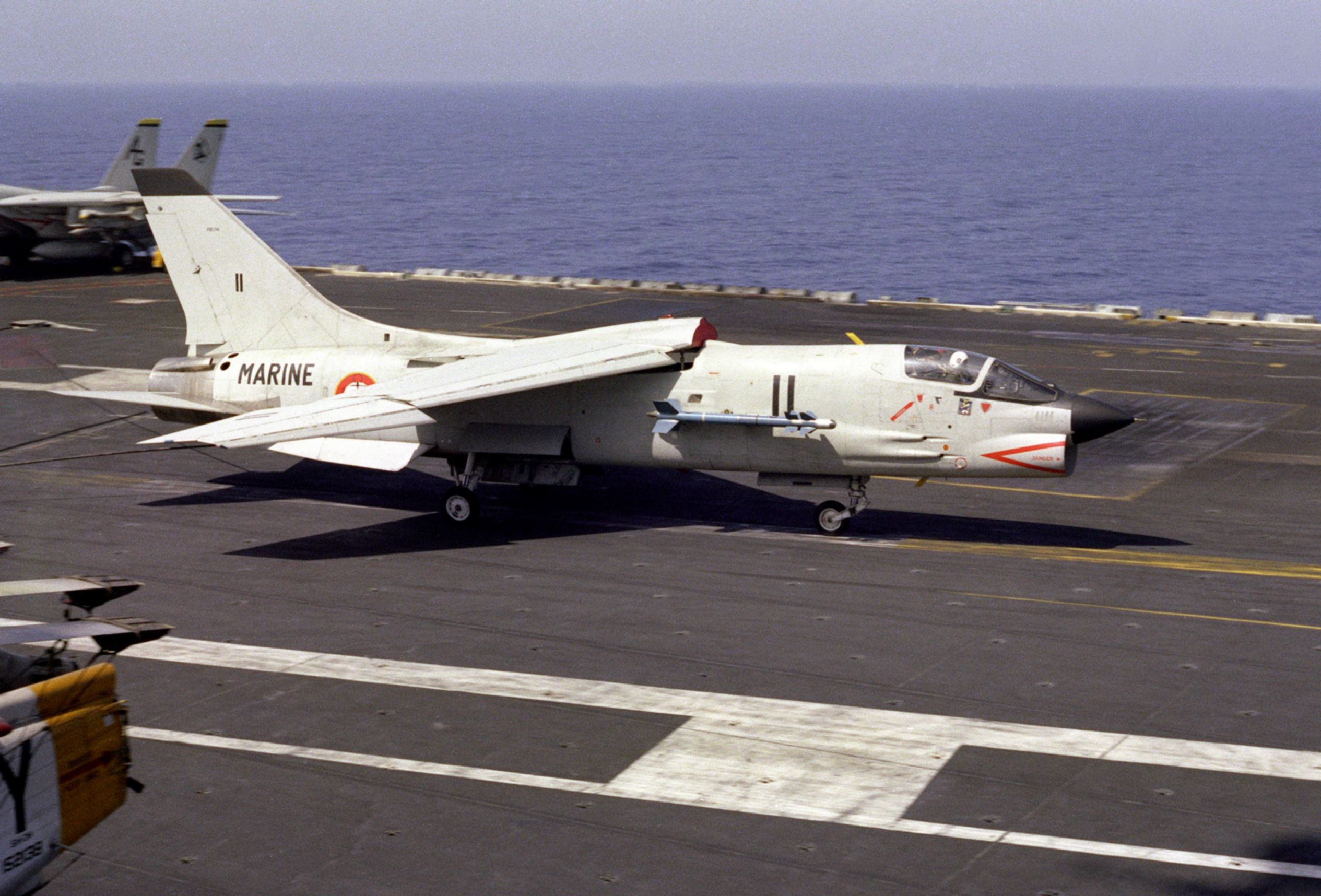
A French Crusader of 12F after catching the wire aboard USS Dwight D. Eisenhower − the aircraft has deployed its variable-incidence wing for landing

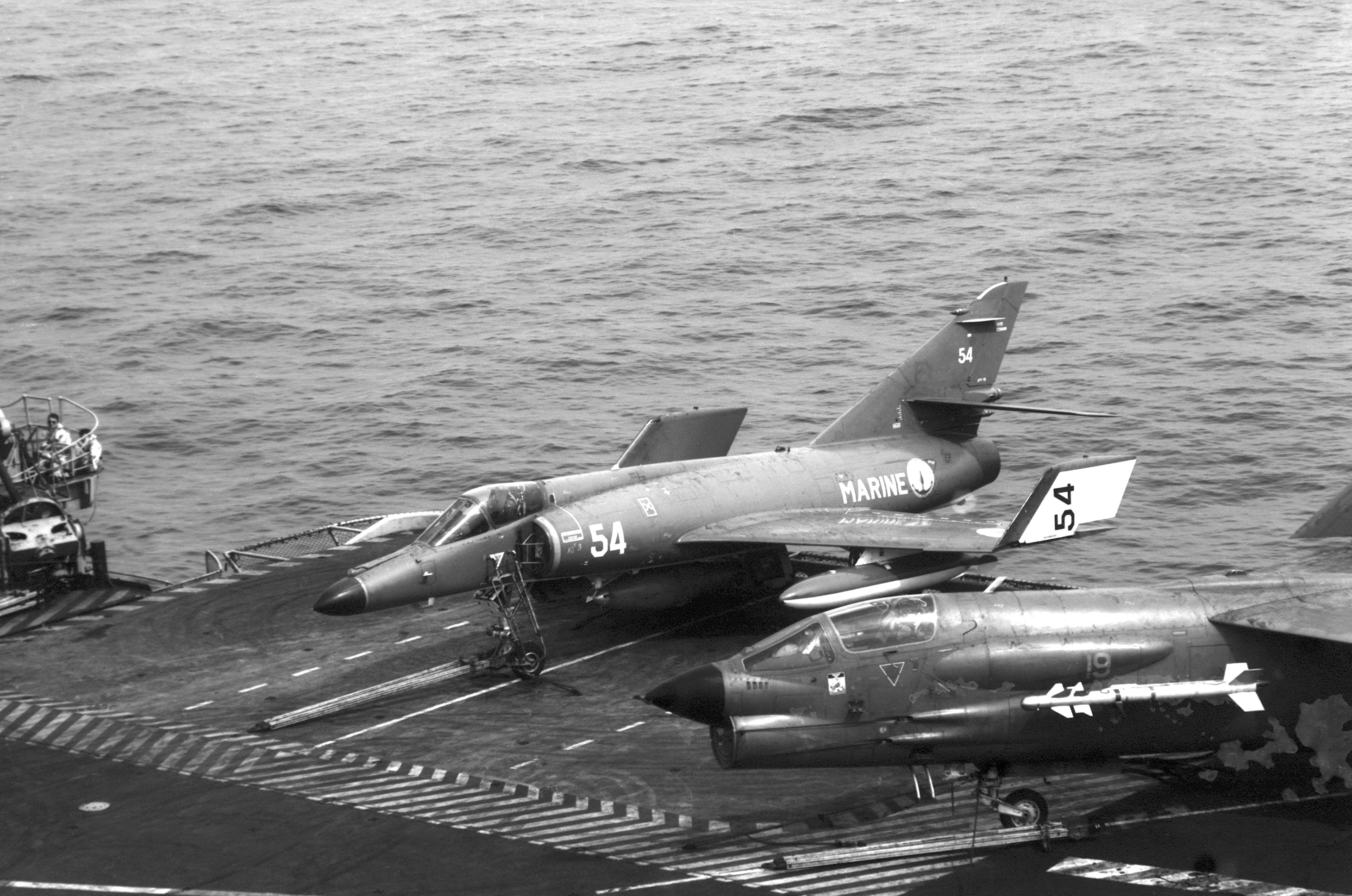
A Crusader parked on the flight deck of Clemenceau in 1988 alongside a Super Étendard. The Crusader is fitted with an R.550 Magic air-to-air missile

Although the Crusader was capable of operating from the fairly small US carriers of the Essex-class, the size of France's new carriers required additional modifications to be made to the standard F-8E in order to safely operate from the decks of Clemenceau and Foch. Many of the modifications to the airframe came from the need to reduce the approach and landing speed of the aircraft. The maximum angle of the aircraft's variable-incidence wing was reduced from 7° to 5°, which improved the handling characteristics at the lower required speed, while boundary layer control was added. This took high-pressure air from the engine and, using special vents located on the wings and tail, blew it over the flight control surfaces, thus improving the low-speed characteristics of the aircraft. This, combined with the addition of leading-edge slats and an increase in the surface area of the tail, were all aimed at providing stability for the aircraft when landing on the smaller decks of the French carriers, which was at speeds of approximately 15 kn (17 mph) less than Crusaders operated by the US Navy.

In addition to changes to the structure of the aircraft, there were also alterations made to account for differences in weapons fit. Crusaders operated by the US would, in addition to their four 20mm guns, usually operate with up to four AIM-9B Sidewinder air-to-air missiles (AAM), mounted on rails on the side of the fuselage. Although French Crusaders were able to operate the Sidewinder, they were adapted to also be capable of carrying the R.530, a domestic AAM available in both infrared and semi-active homing models. In order to utilise the semi-active version of the missile, French Crusaders were fitted with an improved version of the AN/APQ-94 radar, which was designated as the AN/APQ-104, combined with an AN/AWG-4 fire control system. French aircraft would generally carry one R.530 missile on each side, usually with one fitted as a semi-active homing version, and one for infrared homing. Owing to the larger exhaust plume of the R.530 compared to the AIM-9B, a deflector was fitted to protect the sides of the aircraft during missile launches. While the aircraft were procured with the provision for underwing hardpoints, similar to those carried by Crusaders of the US Navy, no actual hardpoints themselves were purchased, limiting the aircraft to carrying weapons using the rails on the fuselage.

Throughout its service with the Aéronavale, the Crusader underwent upgrades to allow it to compete with the progressively more modern interceptors used by other nations. Due to the poor reliability of the R.530 missile, in 1973 the Crusader was fitted to operate the R.550 Magic, a weapon originally developed in the mid-1960s as a short-range AAM. The R.550 was used increasingly, with the upgraded R.550 Magic 2, which replaced the original rear-aspect seeker with an improved all-aspect head, introduced in 1988, and the obsolete R.530 withdrawn in 1989; this though left the Crusader with no radar-guided missile, as the Super 530, an improved version of the R.530, could not be adapted to the AN/APG-104 radar and AN/AWG-4 fire control system of the Crusader. The Crusader's ability to utilise the Sidewinder was removed in 1986. The Crusader also received upgrades to its structure over the course of its service; in 1969, the aircraft received the wings that had been developed for the F-8J, an upgraded version of the F-8E used by the US Navy, while in 1979, new afterburners were fitted to the J57-20A engines.

In the late 1980s, France had begun development of a new multirole combat aircraft that it named as the Rafale. This was intended to replace a number of existing aircraft used by both the Aéronavale and the Armée de l'air, including the Crusader. However, although the Crusader had been in service for more than 20 years, the new aircraft would not be ready for service until the start of the 21st century. As a result, in order to retain an interceptor for use aboard its aircraft carriers, the Navy undertook a modernisation programme to update its remaining Crusaders for another decade's worth of service. A total of 17 Crusaders were therefore earmarked to undergo the upgrade, in which the hydraulic and electrical systems were completely overhauled, reinforcement of the airframe to deal with fatigue issues was done, and a new ejector seat fitted. Additionally, the avionics were substantially improved, with the radar and flight controls reconditioned, and new IFF, Radar Warning Receiver, TACAN GPS and inertial navigation fitted. The first of the upgraded Crusaders, which were designated as F-8P (for prolongé), was delivered in January 1993.

== Operational history ==
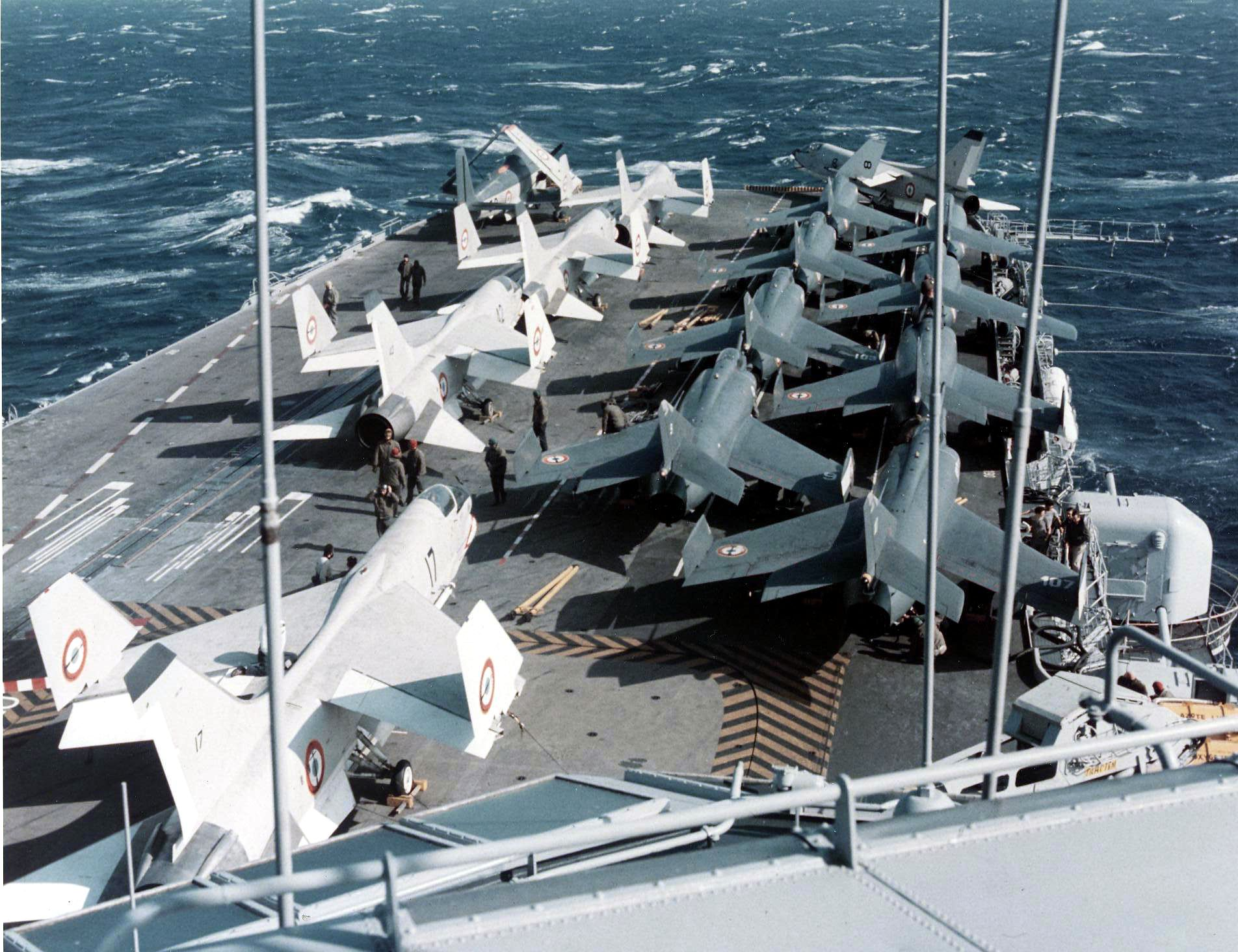
Five Crusaders parked on the forward flight deck of a French aircraft carrier in the 1970s. A single Alizé ASW aircraft is at the forward end of the deck, while eight Étendard IVM strike aircraft and IVP reconnaissance aircraft are located to starboard

As part of the overall contract to procure the Crusader, an agreement to produce a prototype was included. Rather than a new-build airframe being produced, an existing F-8D aircraft was obtained and underwent major conversion to incorporate the various features intended to be found on the production models. The prototype (BuNo 147036), which was designated as a YF-8E(FN), first flew on 27 February 1964, fitted with a stall warning system, an autothrottle and equipment to measure the aircraft's characteristics during the planned test programme. This continued successfully until its 21st flight on 11 April 1964, when the prototype crashed. As a result, testing was stopped until a new aircraft could be obtained to take its place. This was restarted when the first production model (BuNo 151732) was fitted with measuring equipment to resume the test programme, first flying on 26 June 1964.

By late 1964, sufficient airframes had been delivered to allow a full scale programme of flight deck trials – in November, the second and third production models were used aboard the aircraft carrier USS Shangri-La by pilots from both France and the United States. These two airframes, plus aircraft number 4, were also used for weapons trials, including fit checks of the R.530 missile, at NAS China Lake in California. The success of the trials programme in the US led to the Crusader achieving its initial operational status in late 1964. On 6 October 1964, the initial batch of 13 aircraft were loaded aboard Arromanches at Naval Station Norfolk in Virginia for transport back to France. While these were en route, the Aéronavale activated Flottille 12F as its first Crusader squadron. Arromanches arrived in Saint-Nazaire on 4 November, with its load of aircraft disembarked for transport to BAN Lann-Bihoué in Brittany, which was the new home base of the Crusader force. Five months after 12F was reformed, the Aéronavale formed a second Crusader squadron, Flottille 14F, on 1 March 1965, while the remaining 29 aircraft were transported from the United States aboard Foch. The Crusader's first deployment came in April, when 12F sent four aircraft to operate from Clemenceau in the Mediterranean for a week to evaluate the Crusader's performance integrated with the remainder of the French air group. At the same time, the Aéronavale created a detachment, DEM 530, to coordinate the integration of the R.530 missile with the Crusader, while more flight tests with the aircraft were undertaken, including testing its in-flight refuelling capability. Having been grouped together to form Carrier Air Wing 2, 12F and 14F were declared operational on 1 March 1966. From 1966 onwards, 12F and 14F shared responsibility for providing up to 10 aircraft to make up the interceptor squadron assigned to one of the French aircraft carriers. In 1968, the entire Crusader force was moved from BAN Lann-Bihoué to take up residence at BAN Landivisiau on the northern coast of Britanny.

The limitations of the Crusader presented issues with its use – with no provision for carrying external tanks, it was limited to internal fuel, which therefore put limitations on mission duration. With its design and weapon fit, the Crusader was best suited as an air superiority fighter, so the two Crusader squadrons would often practice this mission at high and low altitudes. During the early 1970s, opportunities were available to engage in dissimilar air combat training with Phantoms of the Royal Navy, which were stationed on the opposite side of the English Channel at RNAS Yeovilton. However, the Phantom could carry large external fuel tanks, allowing it to undertake air combat manoeuvring for longer than the Crusader.

On 7 May 1977, a pair of Crusaders from 14F were launched from Foch. At the time, the ship was in the Red Sea preparing for Operation Saphir II, a major deployment intended to ensure the peaceful transition of the Territory of the Afars and the Issas, one of the last French colonial possessions in Africa, to independence as the new Republic of Djibouti. The Crusaders were due to take part in an air defence exercise against a pair of F-100 Super Sabres of Escadron de Chasse 4/11 Jura of the Armée de l'air based in Djibouti. Operating independently, one of the Crusaders came across a pair of aircraft and engaged, initially thinking they were the F-100s. However, they proved to be MiG-21s of the North Yemeni Air Force, which led to the second Crusader being called in. The engagement ultimately ended without shots being fired, and proved to be the only time French Crusaders were engaged in combat.

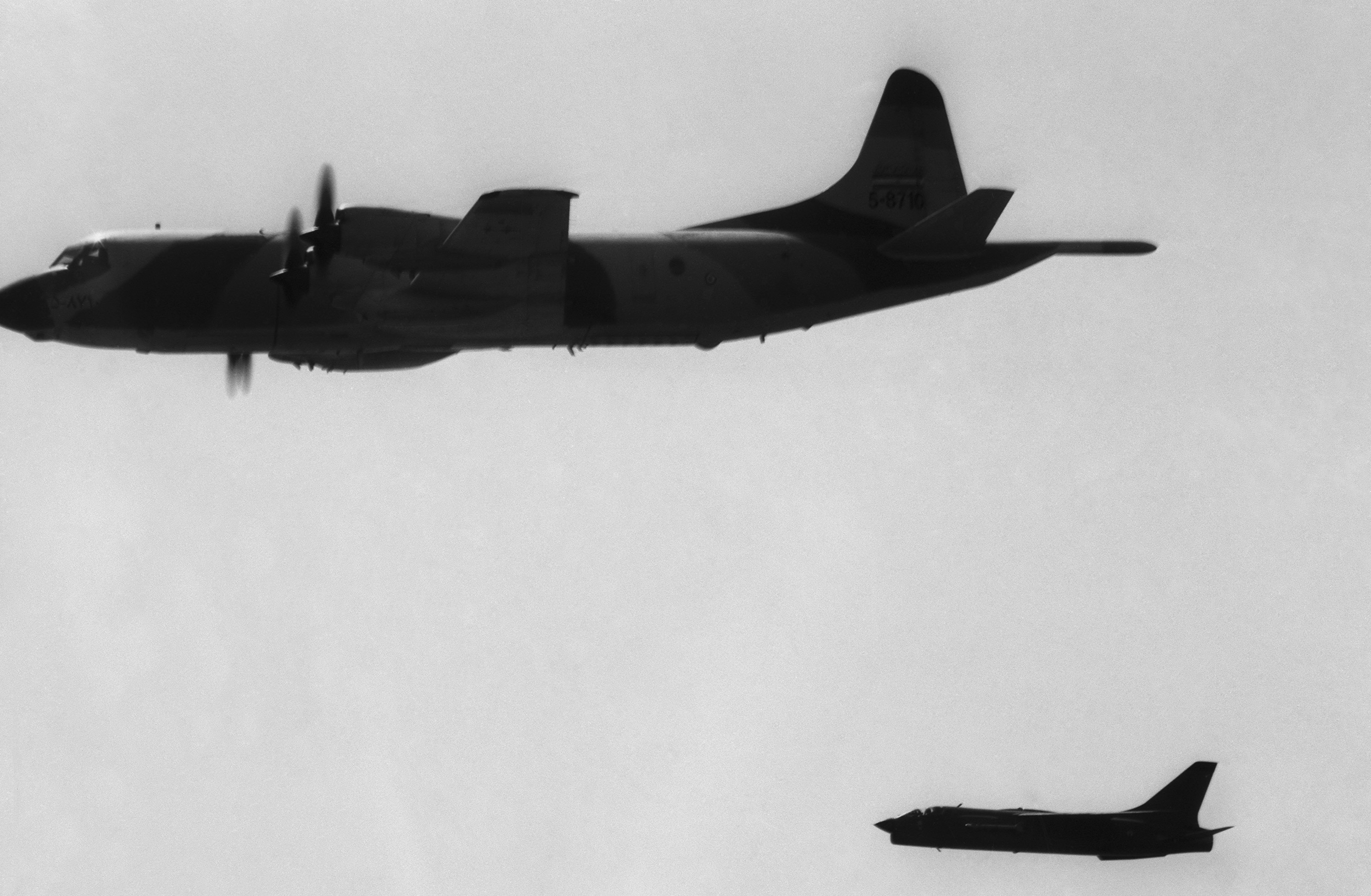
A Crusader of 12F intercepts an Iranian P-3 Orion in the Persian Gulf in 1988.

The incident off Djibouti proved to be one of the last major deployments undertaken by 14F as, in April 1979, the squadron was disbanded to reform as a strike unit operating the new Dassault-Breguet Super Étendard. This left 12F with the sole responsibility for fleet air defence. The squadron continued regular deployments, often engaged in operations that involved escorting strike aircraft – during 1983 and 1984, the French Navy was heavily involved in operations off the coast of Lebanon, which saw a number of strike missions flown from Clemenceau with fighter cover provided by Crusaders of 12F. In October 1984, Foch was deployed as part of Operation Mirmillon against Libya, which formed part of France's efforts to deter Libyan interventions into neighbouring Chad, with Crusaders flying regular missions to protect the carrier and its task group. Clemenceau was also deployed to the Persian Gulf in 1987 during the Iran–Iraq War, with Crusaders of 12F again engaged in air superiority missions, often being required to intercept aircraft of the Iranian Air Force probing close to the task group.

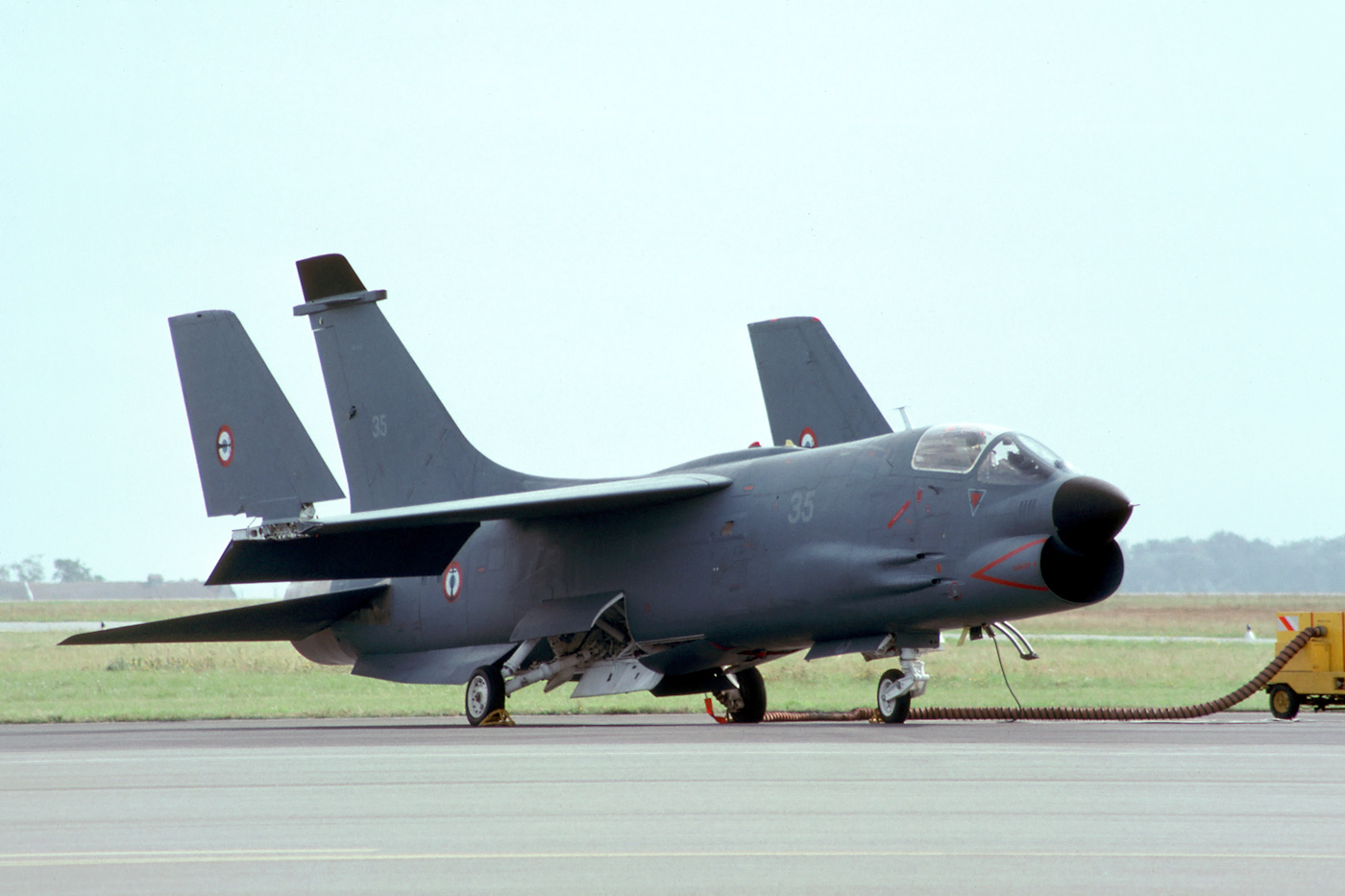
The first F-8P Crusader at Base aérienne Brétigny-sur-Orge in 1992

By the late 1980s, the Crusader had been in service for two decades in the Aéronavale. But, its design dated back to a requirement issued by the US Navy in 1952. The Crusader had last been used as an interceptor in the US Navy in 1976, and was finally withdrawn from frontline service when VFP-63, a photographic reconnaissance squadron operating the RF-8G version, was disbanded in June 1982. As a consequence, compared to other aircraft undertaking the same role, it was becoming increasingly obsolete. Although a new aircraft was in the early stages of development to take the place of both the Crusader and the Super Étendard, as well as a number of aircraft used by the Armée de l'air, this was still many years from completion. While the Super Étendard had only just entered service, and so was expected to be retained for a number of years before it might require updating, a new air defence aircraft was required urgently. This left the Navy facing the prospect of either procuring a new aircraft, at least on a temporary basis, or modernising the Crusader to be able to serve until the new aircraft, the Rafale, was ready. However, if they chose a new aircraft (the most obvious choice being the new F/A-18 Hornet), then it was unlikely that the French government would subsequently allow the procurement of the Rafale for the Aéronavale, leaving the Armée de l'air to shoulder the cost of the aircraft's development alone. So, the decision was taken to modernise a number of the remaining Crusader airframes.

The first upgraded Crusader was delivered to 12F in January 1993, with six available by the end of that year. In total, 17 aircraft went through the upgrade programme, emerging as F-8Ps, by the time it was completed in 1995. This allowed the Crusader to be retained through to the planned introduction of the Rafale, the estimate for which was the year 2000. Despite their increasing age, Crusaders were still heavily used during the 1990s, particularly in operations over the former Yugoslavia. From February to June 1999, Foch was deployed to the Adriatic Sea on Operation Trident. This proved to be 12F's final operational deployment operating the Crusader, with missions flown supporting air strikes over Kosovo. Following one last exercise during October aboard Foch, the last Crusader launch took place on 28 October 1999 during the disembarking of the ship's air group. The final flight of the Aéronavale's Crusaders came on 3 December 1999, when four of 12F's five remaining aircraft undertook a display commemorating the type's 35 years of service. The squadron was disbanded on 15 December 1999 as part of the programme to introduce the new Rafale, with its Crusaders delivered to storage for eventual disposal.

== Variants ==
YF-8E(FN)

- Prototype version of French derivative, constructed by modifying an F-8D to incorporate features specified for French version. 1 produced.

F-8E(FN)

- Fleet air defence fighter developed for the French Navy; incorporated design changes including significantly increased wing lift due to greater slat and flap deflection and the addition of a boundary layer control system, enlarged stabilators to account for operation from smaller French aircraft carriers. In addition, featured AN/APQ-104 radar, an upgraded version of AN/APQ-94. 42 built.

TF-8E(FN)

- Two-seat training version planned as part of original order; cancelled as a result of US decision not to produce trainer. None produced.

F-8P

- Upgraded version of F-8E(FN) intended to extend service life of aircraft from late 1980s to late 1990s. 17 produced. (Note: The 'P' was not technically an official series letter – it stood for "Prolongé" meaning "modernised")

== Operators ==
France

- French Navy (Aéronavale)
  - Flottille 12F (1964–1999)
  - Flottille 14F (1965–1979)
  - Détachement d'Expérimentations Militaires 530 (1965–1966)

== Aircraft on display ==
Preserved French Crusaders

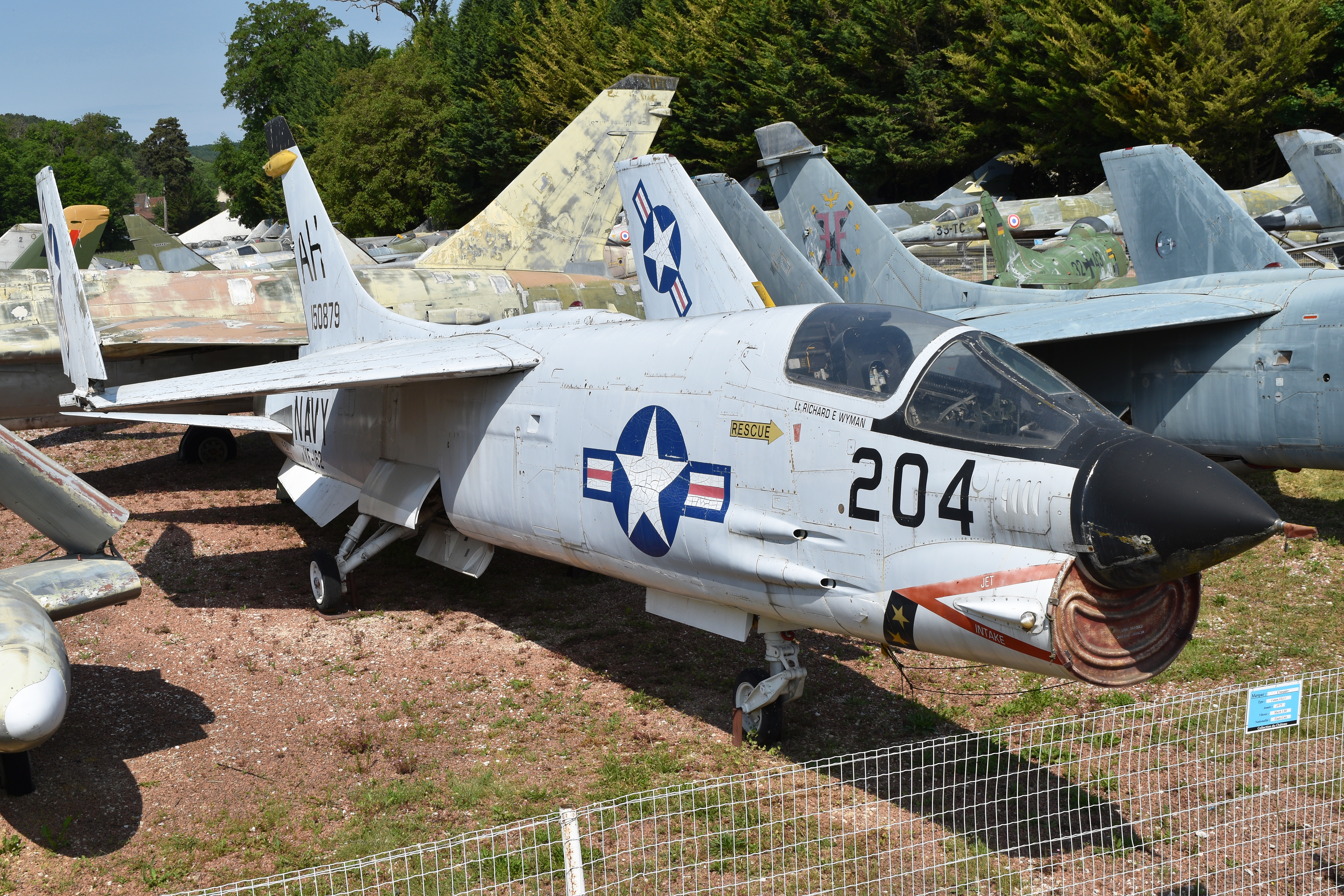
F-8E(FN) Crusader n°1 in the guise of BuNo 150879 of VF-162

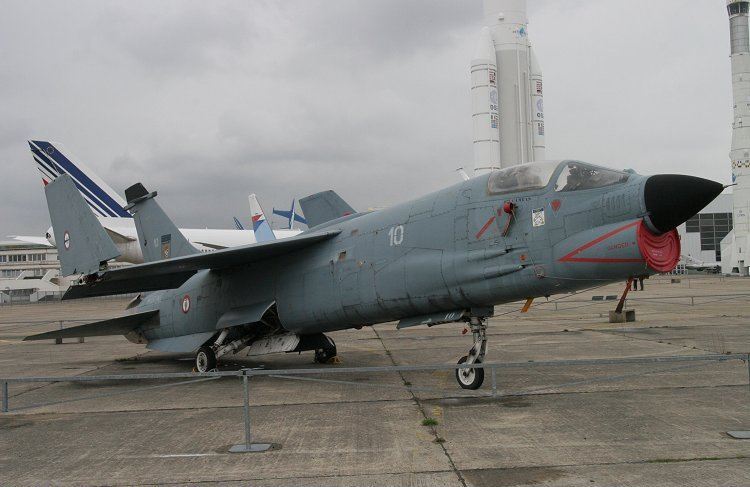
F-8P Crusader n°10, formerly of 12F, on display at the Musée de l'air et de l'espace

The below list details the aircraft that are still complete following the final retirement of the Crusader, none of which are in flying condition. Additionally, a number of airframes had sections saved following disposal.

- n°1 (BuNo 151732) – Château de Savigny-lès-Beaune, Savigny-lès-Beaune (Note: Painted in USN VF-162 squadron markings)
- n°3 (BuNo 151734) – BAN Lann-Bihoué, Lorient
- n°8 (BuNo 151739) – Musée Aéronautique d’Orange, Orange
- n°10 (BuNo 151741) – Musée de l'Air et de l'Espace, Le Bourget (Note: Stored not on public display)
- n°11 (BuNo 151742) – Musée de l'Aéronautique Navale, Rochefort
- n°19 (BuNo 151750) – Aeroscopia, Toulouse
- n°29 (BuNo 151760) – BAN Landivisiau, Landivisiau
- n°32 (BuNo 151763) – Conservatoire de l'Air et de l'Espace d'Aquitaine, Mérignac
- n°34 (BuNo 151765) – Aérodrome de Lons-le-Saunier - Courlaoux, Lons-le-Saunier
- n°35 (BuNo 151766) – Château de Savigny-lès-Beaune, Savigny-lès-Beaune
- n°37 (BuNo 151768) – AIA de Cuers-Pierrefeu, Cuers

n°34 (BuNo 151765) was the last Aéronavale Crusader to fly, and therefore the very last operational Crusader in the world. In 2024, the Vietnam War Flight Museum, located in Houston, launched a fundraising campaign to try and purchase this aircraft, in order to transport it from France where it would be restored to flying status and displayed in the guise of a US Navy Crusader to represent the pilots that flew the type during the Vietnam War.

== Accidents and incidents ==
The Crusader was a notoriously difficult aircraft to fly, and suffered a particularly high rate of accidents in its service in the US Navy. It had a high landing speed, which made recovering aboard small aircraft carriers difficult, while its variable-incidence wing, which kept the wing at a different angle of attack to the aircraft's nose, also proved difficult for the pilot to deal with on approaches to carriers. Steering was also an issue, as, when the nosewheel steering was disengaged, the Crusader had a fully castered nosewheel, which made it difficult to move the aircraft. Ultimately, of the 1,219 Crusaders used by the US Navy and US Marines Corps, a total of 1,106 had been involved in some kind of accident or mishap.

Although France only procured a total of 43 Crusaders (including the prototype), 29 of them were written off during the type's service with the Aéronavale. The first of these came in April 1964 when the YF-8E(FN) prototype crashed during its initial test programme. The first loss of an operational Crusader came when n°28, which was operating as part of 14F, crashed near Lorient in September 1965. Of the 29 losses, the majority were F-8E(FN) variants, with the last of these taking place in March 1992, when n°6 of 12F crashed while attempting a landing at Kalamata Air Base in Greece. The final four losses were of F-8P aircraft between 1995 and 1997.

== Specifications (F-8E(FN)) ==

Data from An Illustrated Guide to Modern Naval Aviation and Aircraft Carriers

General characteristics

- Crew: 1
- Length: 54 ft 6 in (16.6 m)
- Wingspan: 35 ft 5 in (10.87 m)
- Height: 15 ft 9 in (4.8 m)
- Empty weight: 19,751 lb (8,960 kg)
- Max takeoff weight: 34,000 lb (15,420 kg)
- Powerplant: 1 × Pratt & Whitney J57-20A axial-flow turbojet, 11,700 lbf (52 kN) thrust dry, 18,000 lbf (80 kN) with afterburner

Performance

- Maximum speed: 1,000 mph (1,609 km/h, 870 kn) at altitude
- Maximum speed: Mach 1.5
- Ferry range: 1,730 mi (2,780 km, 1,500 nmi)
- Service ceiling: 50,000 ft (15,240 m)

Armament

- 2 × R.530 / R.550 Magic or 4 × AIM-9 Sidewinder air-to-air missiles
- 4 × 20mm Colt Mk 12 cannon

Avionics

- Magnavox AN/AWG-4 fire control system incorporating AN/APQ-104 fire control radar

== See also ==
Related development

- Vought F-8 Crusader

Aircraft of comparable role, configuration, and era

- McDonnell Douglas F-4K Phantom
- McDonnell Douglas A-4G Skyhawk

Related lists

- List of fighter aircraft
- List of military aircraft of France

== Bibliography ==
- Haskew, Michael (2015). Aircraft Carriers: The Illustrated History of the World's Most Important Warships. Minneapolis, Minnesota: Quarto Publishing. ISBN 978-0-7603-4814-7.
- Joos, Gerhard (1966). "The Chance Vought F-8A-E Crusader" (PDF). Profile Publications. No. 90. Leatherhead, Surrey: Profile Publications. Archived from the original (PDF) on 20 February 2025.
- Jordan, John (1983). An Illustrated Guide to Modern Naval Aviation and Aircraft Carriers. London: Salamander Books. ISBN 978-0-6680-5824-7.
- Miller, David (2001). Illustrated Directory of Warships of the World. Osceola, Wisconsin: MBI Publishing. ISBN 978-0-7603-1127-1.
- Stijger, Eric (1993). "Aéronavale Crusaders". Air International. 45 (4). Key Publishing: 192–196.
- White, Rowland (2009). Phoenix Squadron : HMS Ark Royal, Britain's Last Topguns and the Untold Story of their Most Extraordinary Mission. London, UK: Bantam Press. ISBN 978-0-59305-450-5.
