= R.530 =

Matra R.530
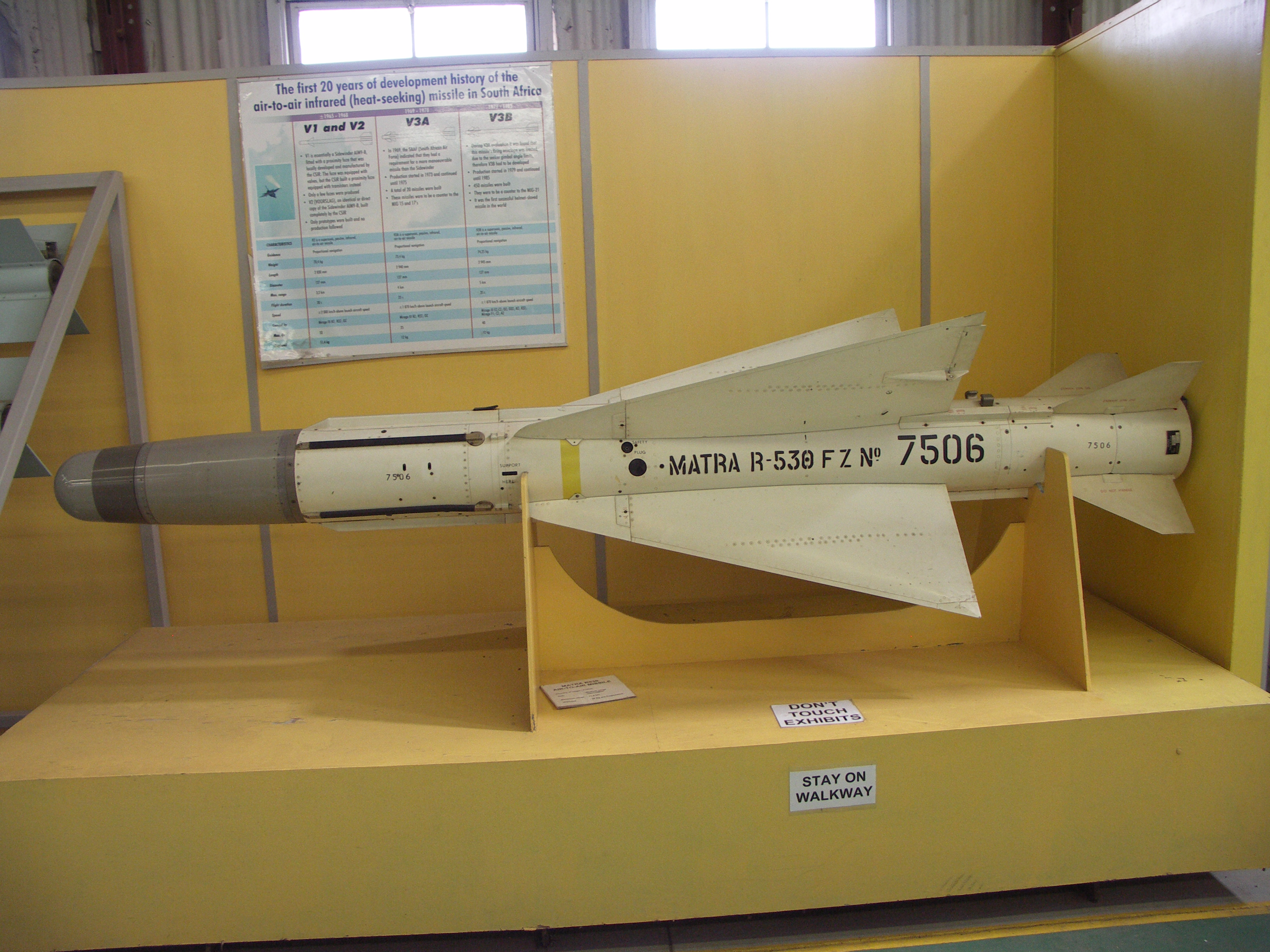
- An R530 exhibited at the South African Air Force Museum, Swartkop
- Type: Short-range air-to-air missile
- Place of origin: France

Service history
- In service: 1962

Production history
- Manufacturer: Matra

Specifications
- Mass: 192 kg (423 lbs)
- Length: 3.28 m (10.7 ft)
- Diameter: 263 mm (10.3 in)
- Wingspan: 1.1 m (3.6 ft)
- Warhead weight: 27.2 kg (60 lbs)
- Engine: Two-stage solid rocket, Hotchkiss-Brandt/SNPE Antoinette rocket 83.3 kN for 2.7 s + 6.5 s cruise (18,726 lbf)
- Operational range: 1.5 to 20 km (.93 mi to 12.4 mi, .8 to 10.8 nmi)
- Maximum speed: Mach 2.7 (2,071 mph, 3,333 kmh, 1,800 kn)
- Guidance system: Semi active radar homing and infrared homing
- Launch platform: Dassault Mirage F1; Dassault Mirage III; F-8 Crusader

The Matra R.530 is a French medium to short range air-to-air missile. It was available in infrared homing and semi active radar homing as the main armament of the Mirage III which was able to carry a single missile in the centerline, the Mirage F1, which carried up to three, utilizing wing hardpoints, and the F-8 Crusader, also carrying two on the sides of the fuselage in French Navy service.

== Operational history ==
The Israeli Air Force (IDF/AF) purchased 15 semi-active radar-homing R.530 missiles from France, along with three training rounds and eight launch pylons, to go with the new Mirage IIICJ "Shahak". It was intended to complement the domestic Rafael Shafrir infrared-homing air-to-air missile. The missile was christened "Yahalom" (Hebrew for "diamond") in Israeli service and was issued to the No. 110 and No. 117 squadrons for their quick reaction alert (QRA) aircraft. Both squadrons achieved weapons qualification in 1964.

On 29 November 1966, an Israeli Air Force Dassault Mirage III shot down two Egyptian MiG-19s which were trying to intercept an Israeli reconnaissance Piper J-3 Cub in Israeli airspace. The first MiG was destroyed with an R.530 fired from less than a mile away, marking the first aerial kill for the missile. The second MiG-19 was destroyed with cannon fire.

During the Six-Day War, the R.530, as was common for early air-to-air missiles in the 1960s, proved to be chronically unreliable and difficult to use, especially in the close-range dogfights that characterized aerial combat in the war. The R.530 required a radar lock from the Cyrano radar of the Mirage III in order to be launched, but the Cyrano radar was severely hampered by ground clutter at low altitude, where most air combat took place during the Six-Day War, rendering the R.530 nearly useless. The weapon failed to achieve any kills during the Six-Day War.

== Gallery ==
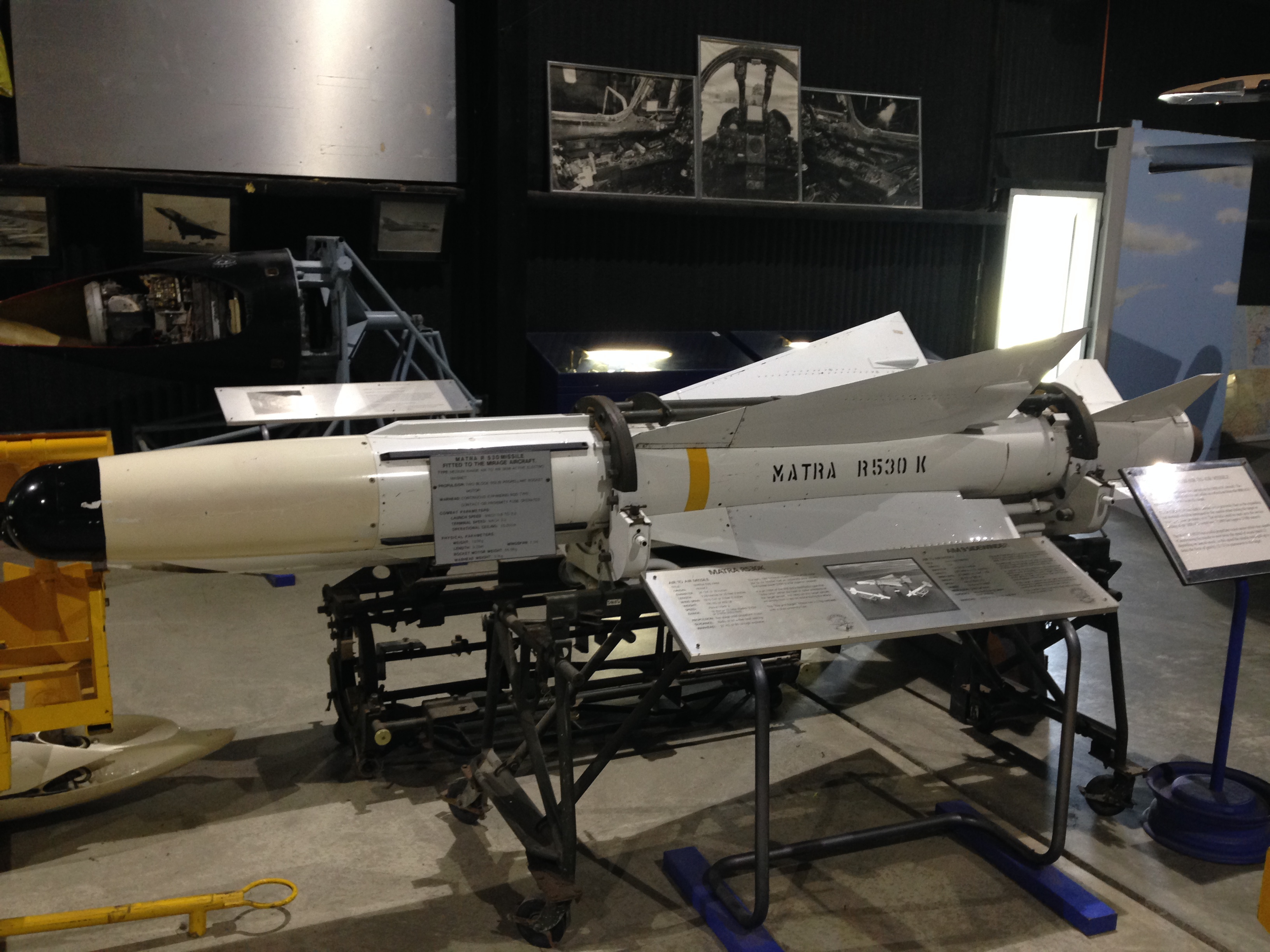
Matra R.530 missile

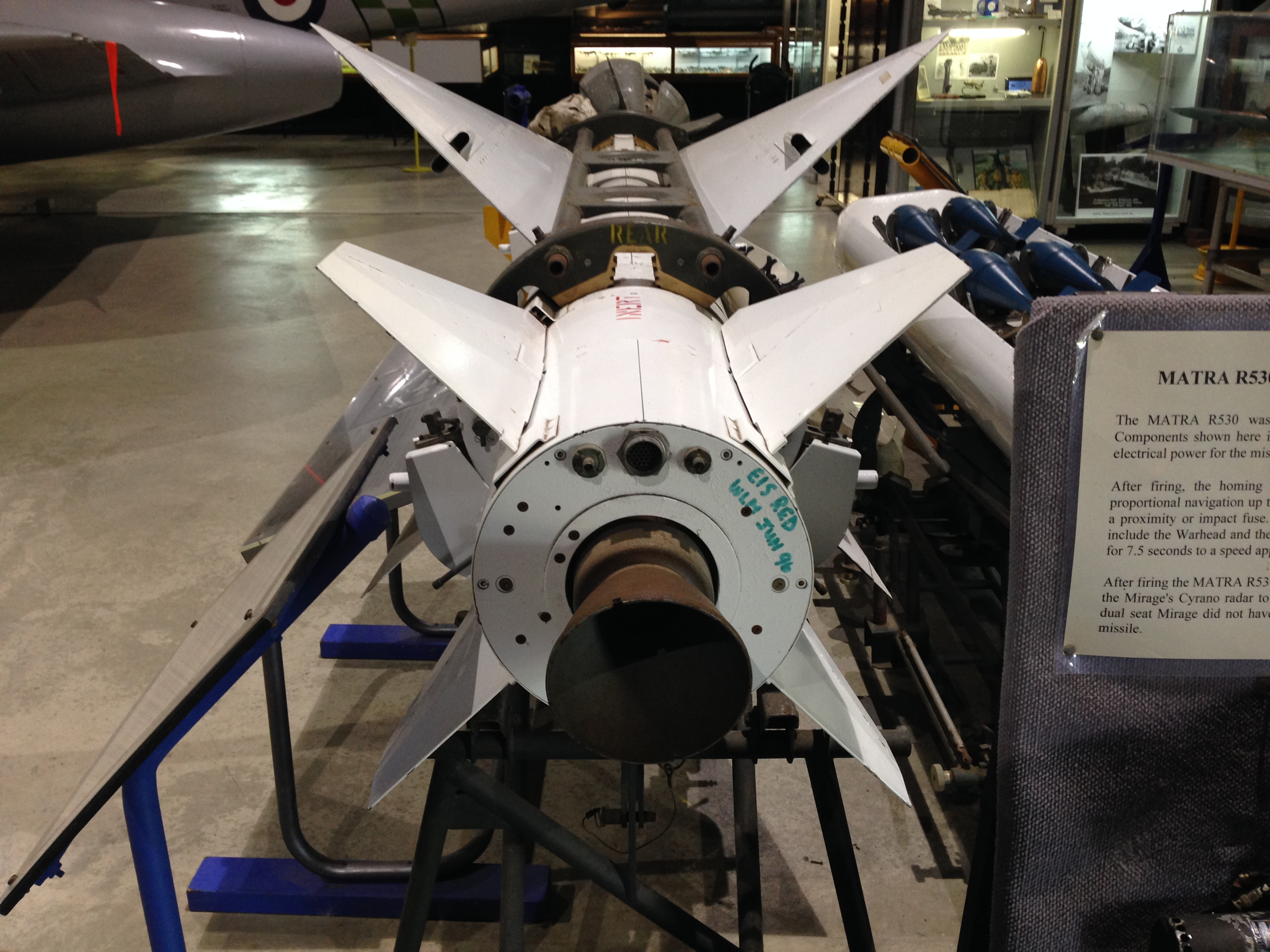
Matra R.530 missile

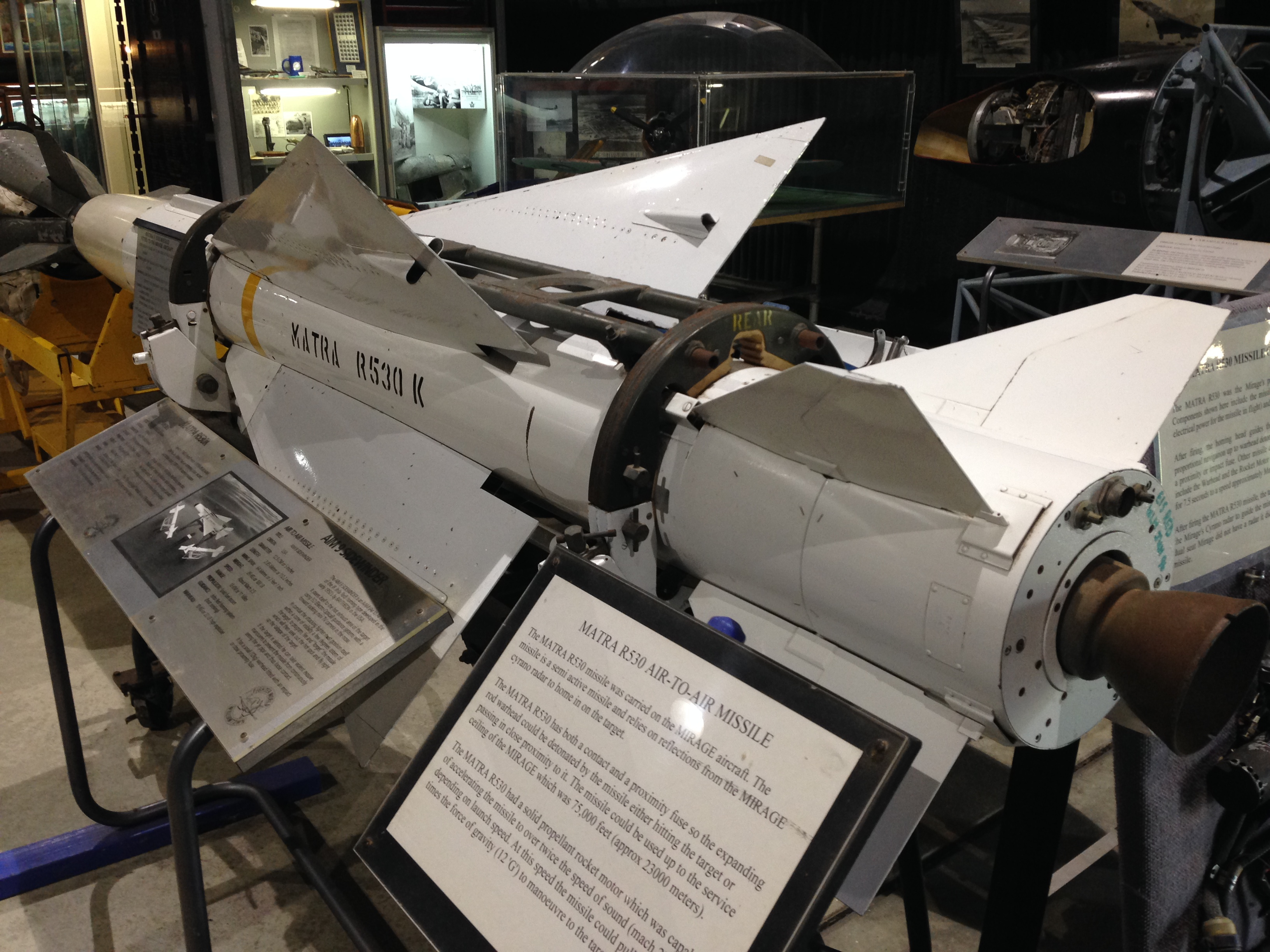
Matra R.530 missile

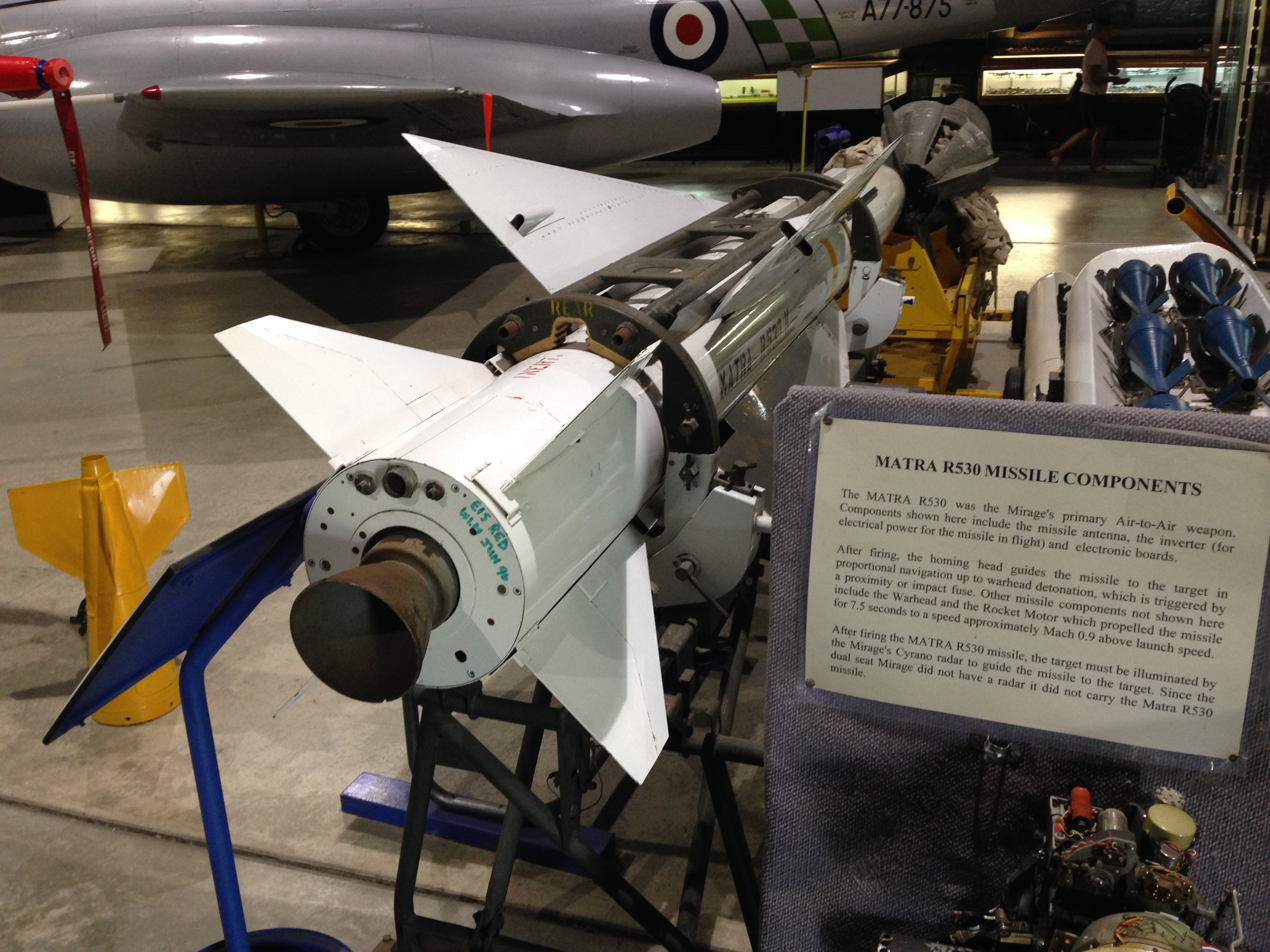
Matra R.530 missile

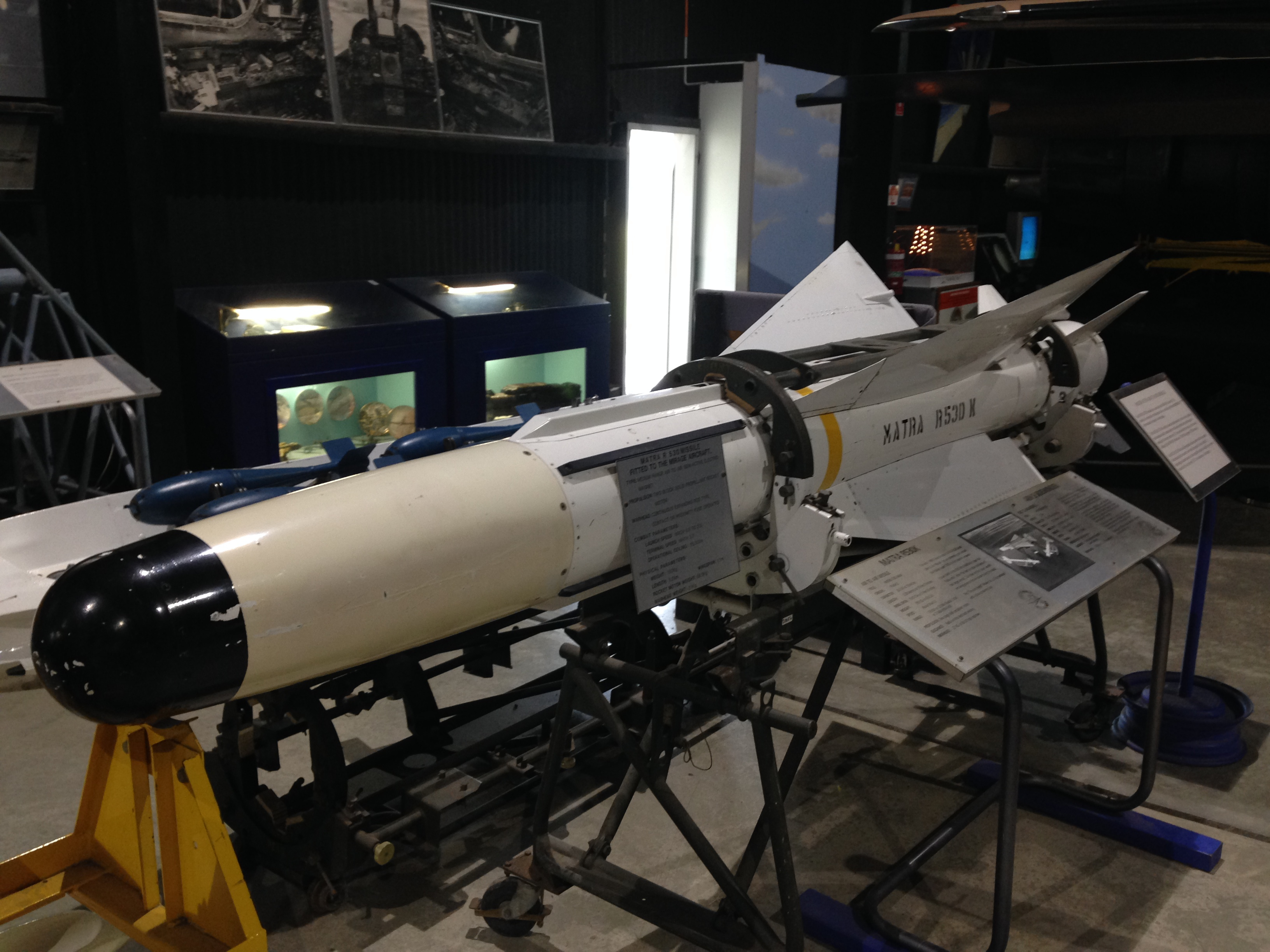
Matra R.530 missile

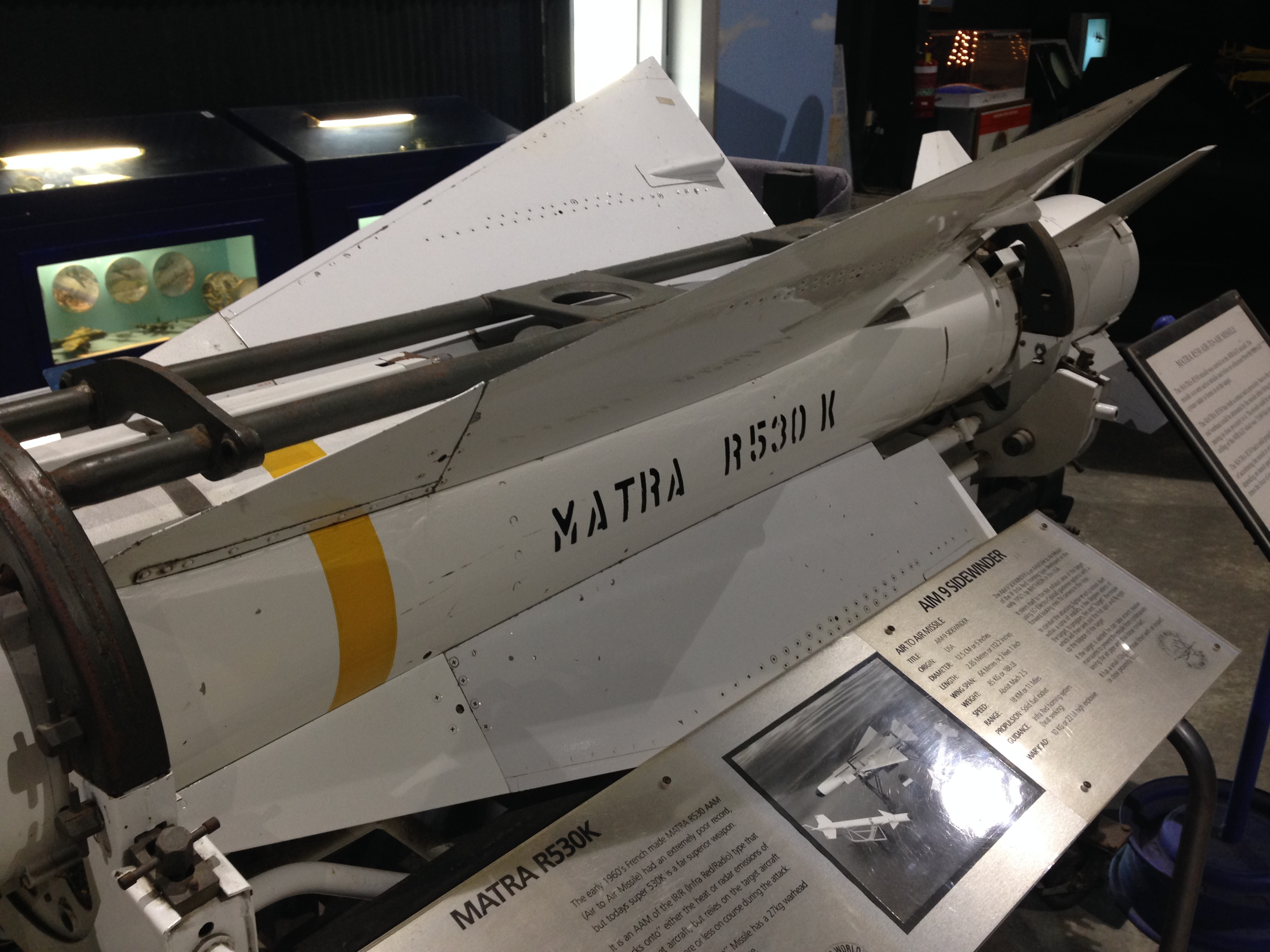
Matra R.530 missile

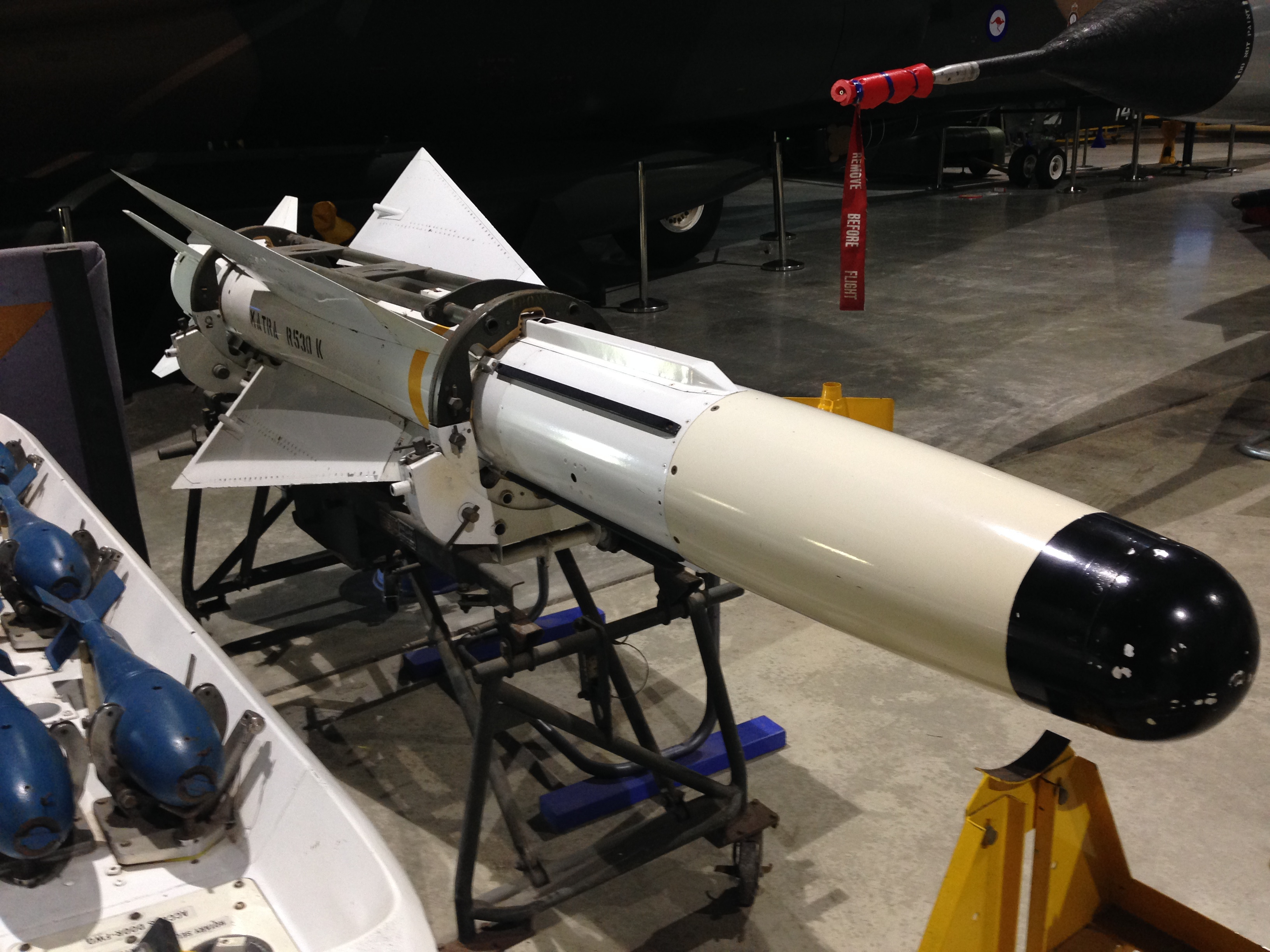
Matra R.530 missile

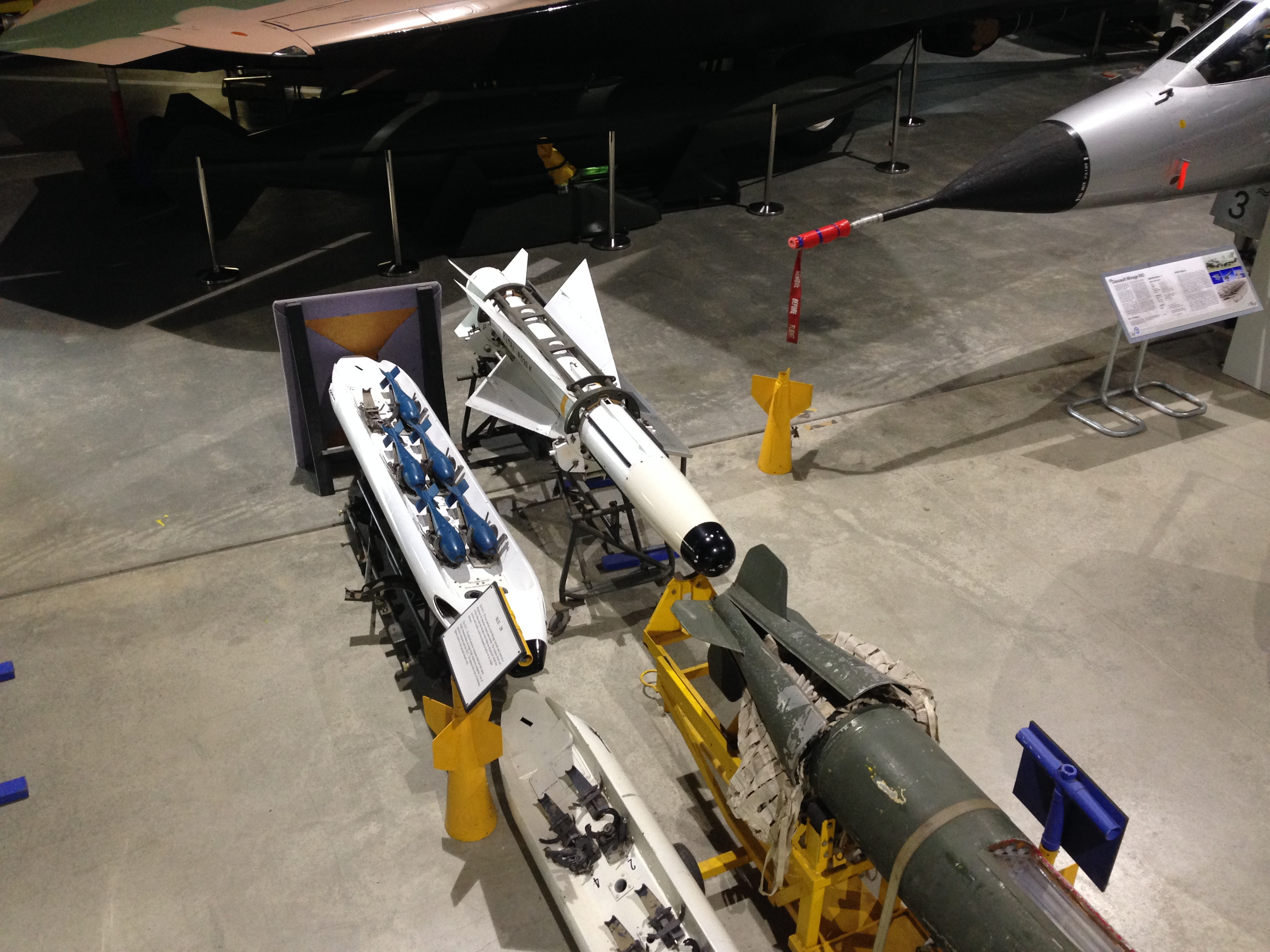
Matra R.530 missile

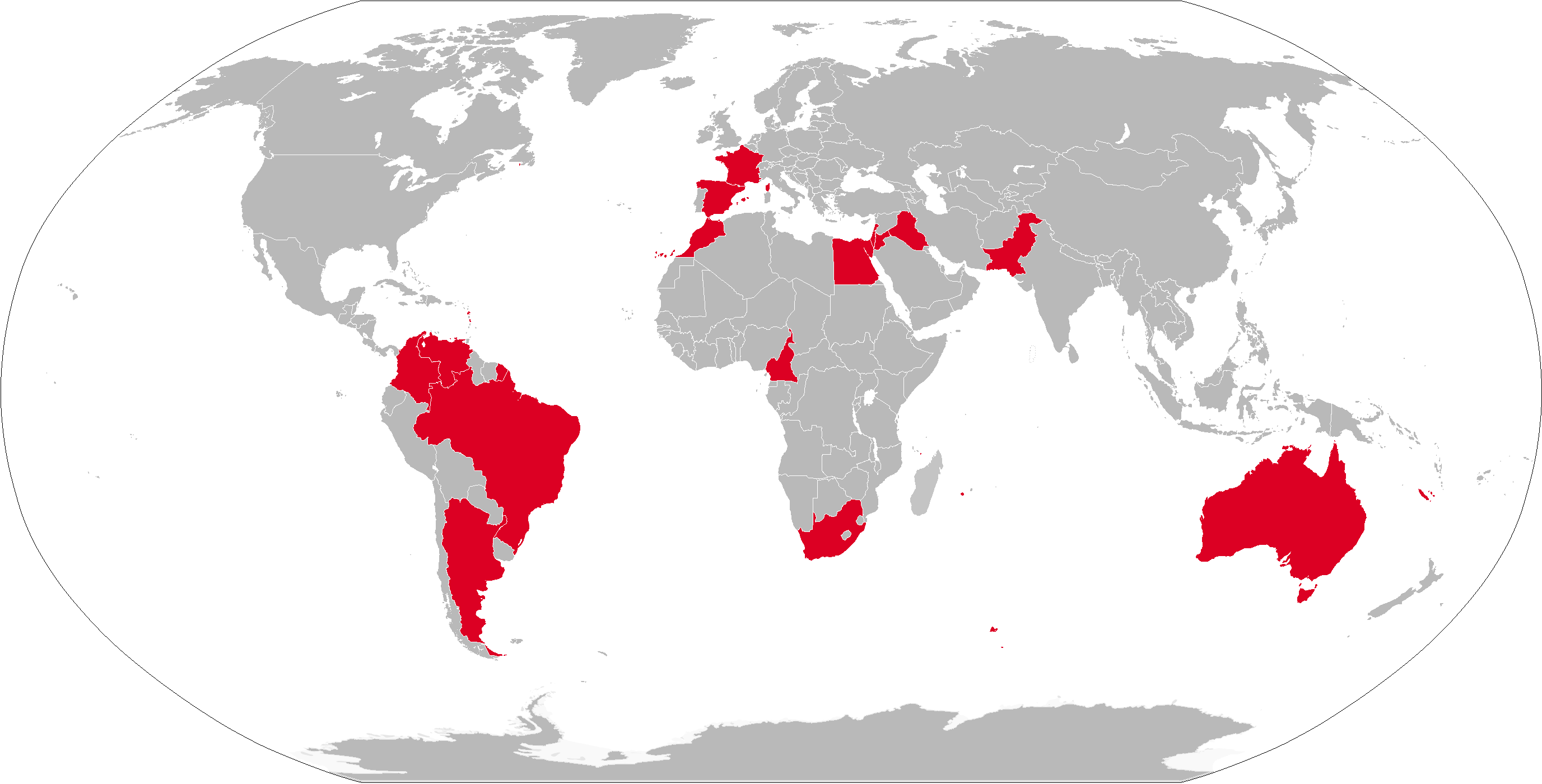
Map with former R.530 operators in red

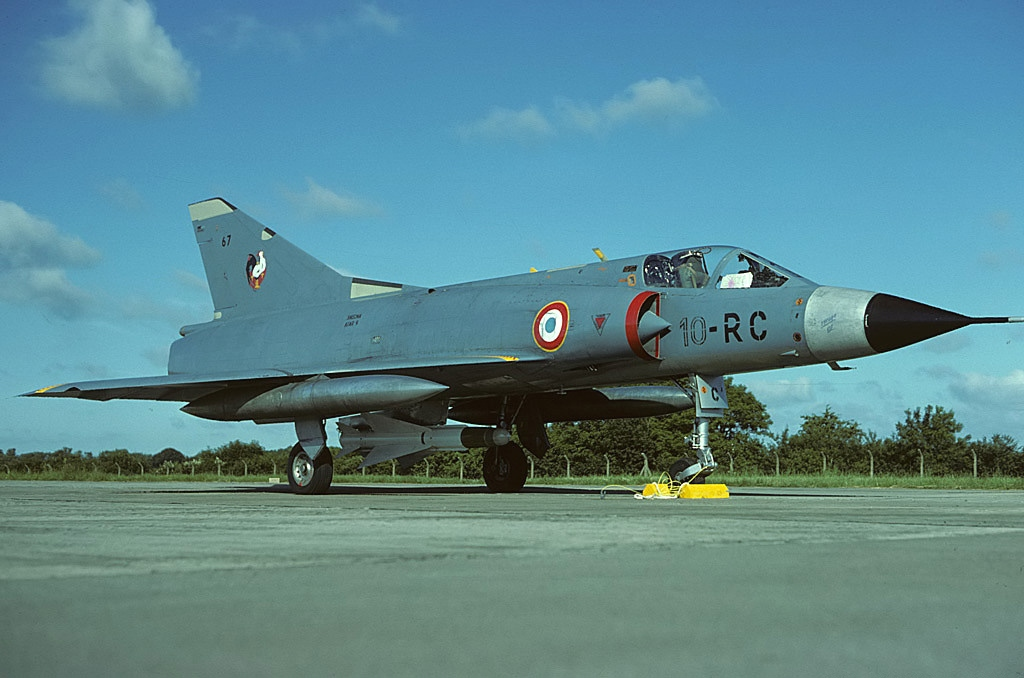
Mirage IIIC of Escadron de Chasse 2/10 Seine in 1980 armed with a Matra R.530

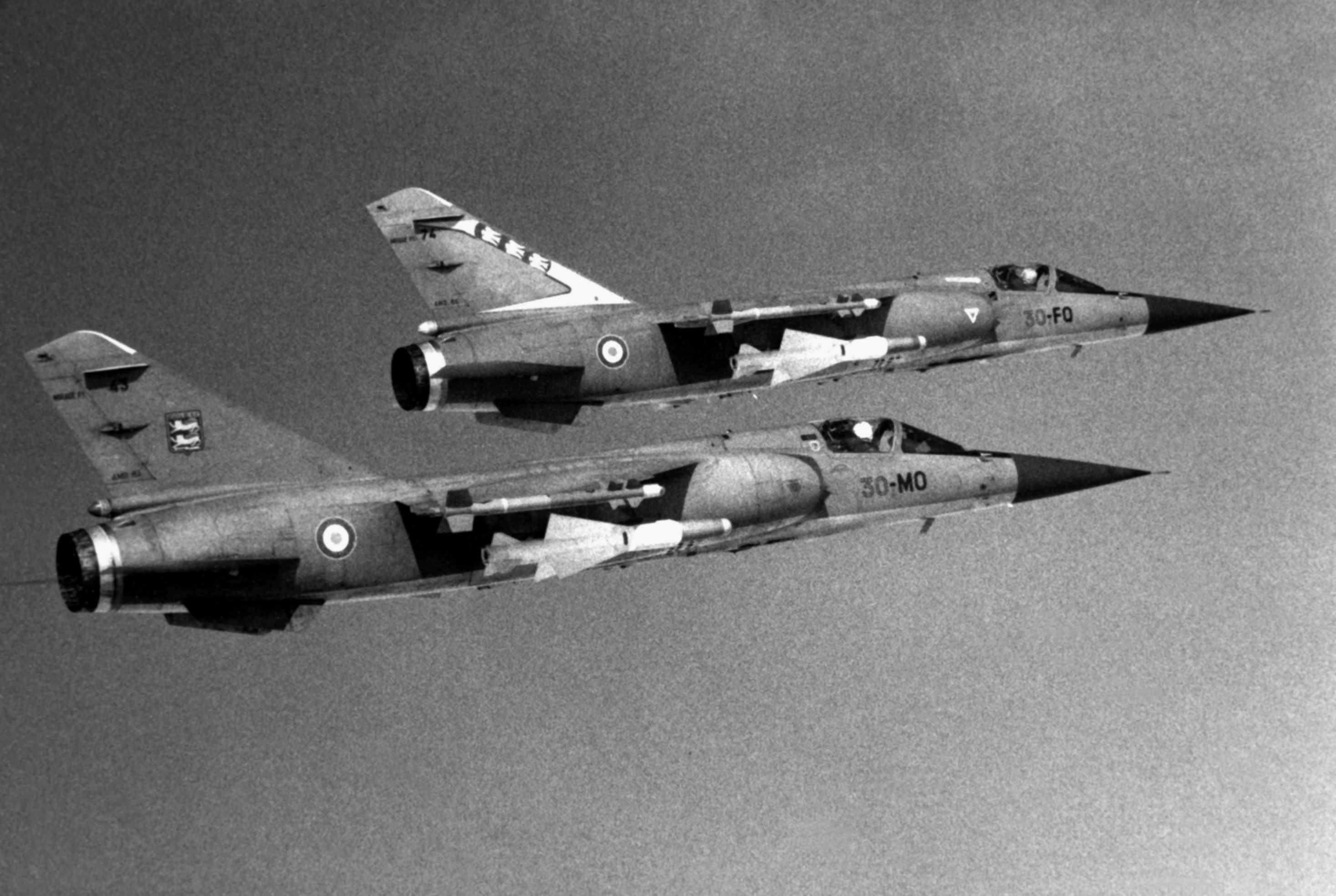
Mirage F1s of Escadron de Chasse 2/30 Normandie-Niemen and Escadron de Chasse 3/30 Lorraine in 1986 armed with Matra R.530s

== Former operators ==
Argentina
Australia
Brazil
France
Israel
India
Jordan
Lebanon
Libya
Morocco
Pakistan
South Africa
Spain
Venezuela
Qatar

== See also ==
Related development:

- Super 530

Similar weapons

- AIM-4 Falcon
- AIM-26 Falcon
- AIM-7 Sparrow (initial variants)
- K-8 (missile)
