= Flottille 14F =

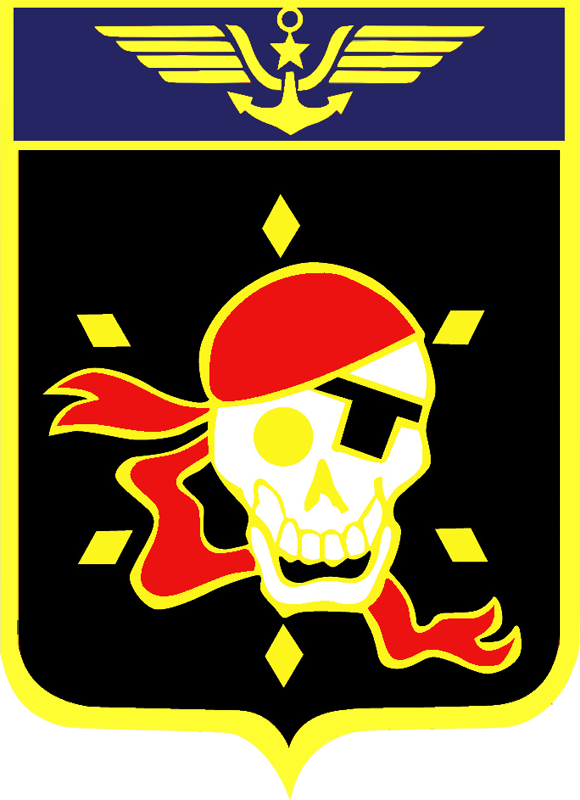
- Active: 15 January 1953 – 1 October 1964; 1 March 1965 – 17 April 1979; 1 June 1979 – 1 July 1991
- Country: France
- Branch: French Naval Aviation

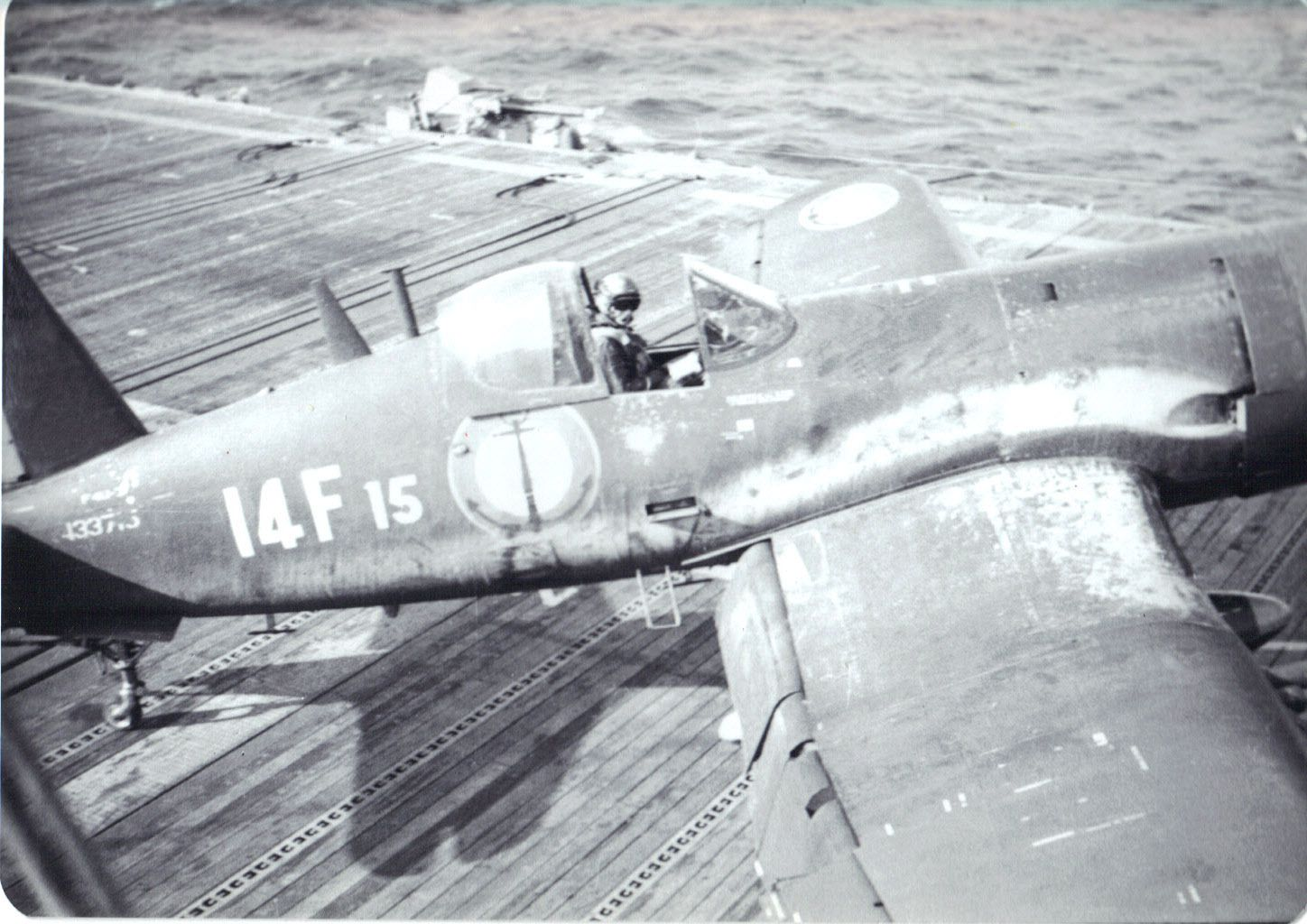
A Corsair of 14F aboard La Fayette in 1962

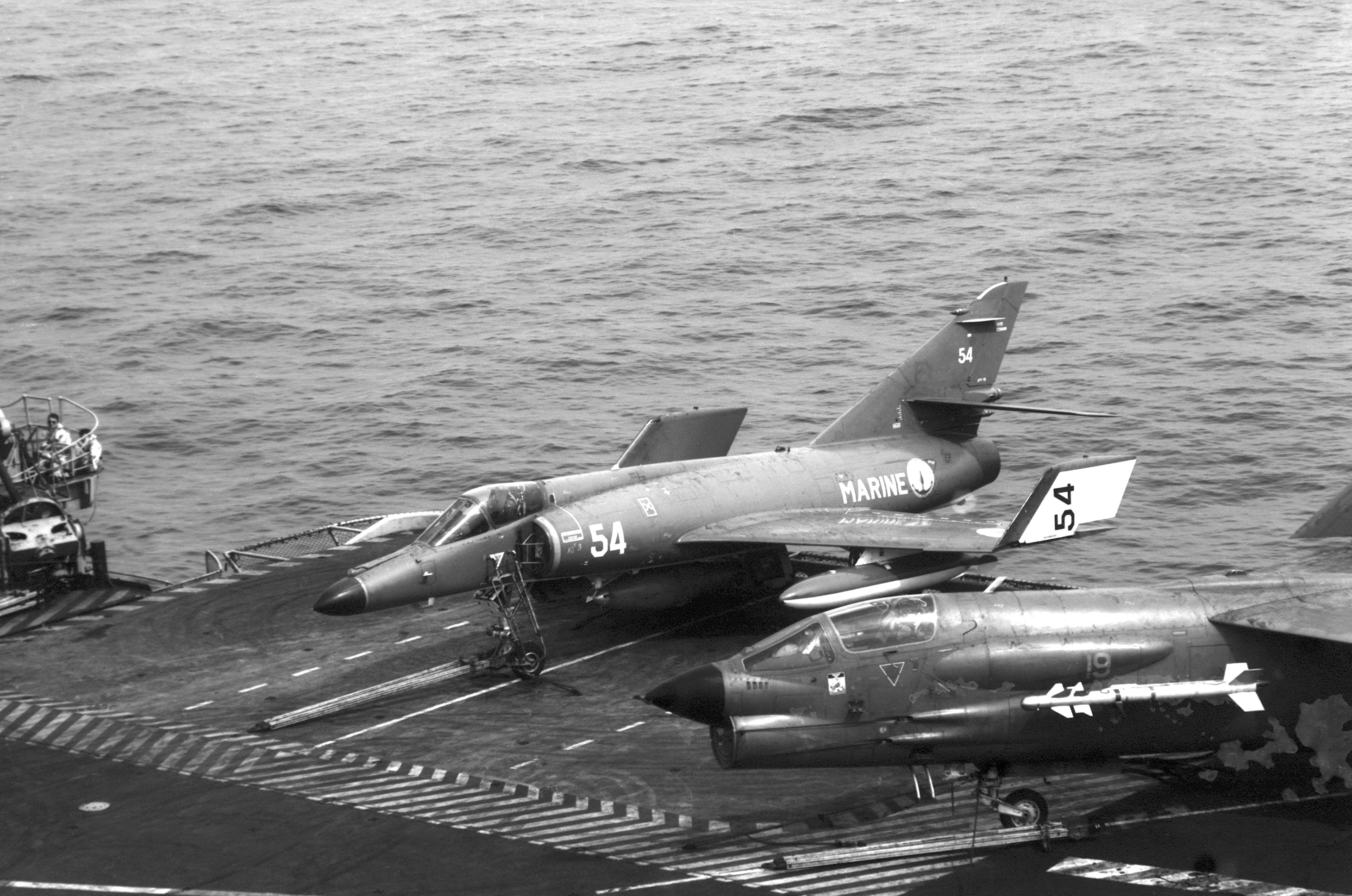
A Super Étendard of 14F aboard Clemenceau in 1988, alongside a Crusader

Flottille 14F was a unit of the Aéronavale, the air arm of the French Navy. Originally formed in 1953 as a carrier-based close air support squadron, it later served as a fleet air defence unit before returning to its original role in the 1970s. The squadron served until being disbanded in 1991.

== History ==
Flottille 14F was formed in January 1953 as a new carrier-based fighter squadron operating the Vought F4U Corsair, the first Aéronavale unit to operate the aircraft. However, because the squadron was primarily used for close air support, its first major deployment came when it operated from bases in French Indochina during the First Indochina War, remaining until July 1954. The squadron was returned to France, where it was subsequently deployed for operations in the Algerian War, primarily stationed at BAN Hyères, but regularly forward deployed to airfields in Algeria. Its use in Algeria was interspersed with deployment aboard the aircraft carrier Arromanches during the Suez Crisis. In 1961, the squadron moved to La Karouba in Tunisia, where it was involved in the Bizerte crisis. 14F remained in North Africa until August 1963, when it returned to France, disbanding in August 1964, the final Aéronavale unit to operate the Corsair.

In March 1965, 14F was reformed as the second unit to operate the Aéronavale's newly acquired fleet air defence fighter, the Vought F-8E(FN) Crusader. Alongside Flottille 12F, the unit was assigned to provide detachments of up to 10 aircraft to provide the interceptor squadron for operation aboard France's new aircraft carriers, Clemenceau and Foch. The two units were grouped together to form Carrier Air Group 2, being declared operational in March 1966. 14F undertook a range of deployments during the next decade and a half, including a number to the Horn of Africa between 1974 and 1977 as part of France's mission to ensure the successful transition of Djibouti to independence. On one of these deployments, in May 1977, a pair of Crusaders operating from Foch were on a planned exercise to engage in a simulated air combat with F-100 Super Sabres from the Armée de l'air, but instead founded themselves in an actual engagement with MiG-21s from North Yemen.

14F gave up its Crusaders in April 1979, converting from the air defence role to become a strike squadron operating the new Dassault-Breguet Super Étendard. The squadron reformed in June 1979 as one of three to operate the Super Étendard operationally, alongside Flottille 11F and Flottille 17F. However, its time as a front-line unit lasted only until 1987, when it was transitioned to become the Super Étendard operational conversion squadron. The squadron was disbanded once again, this time in 1991, as part of the post-Cold War restructuring of the armed forces.

== Aircraft operated ==
- Vought F4U Corsair – January 1953 to October 1964
- Vought F-8E(FN) Crusader – March 1965 to April 1979
- Dassault-Breguet Super Étendard – June 1979 to July 1991
