= Flottille 12F =

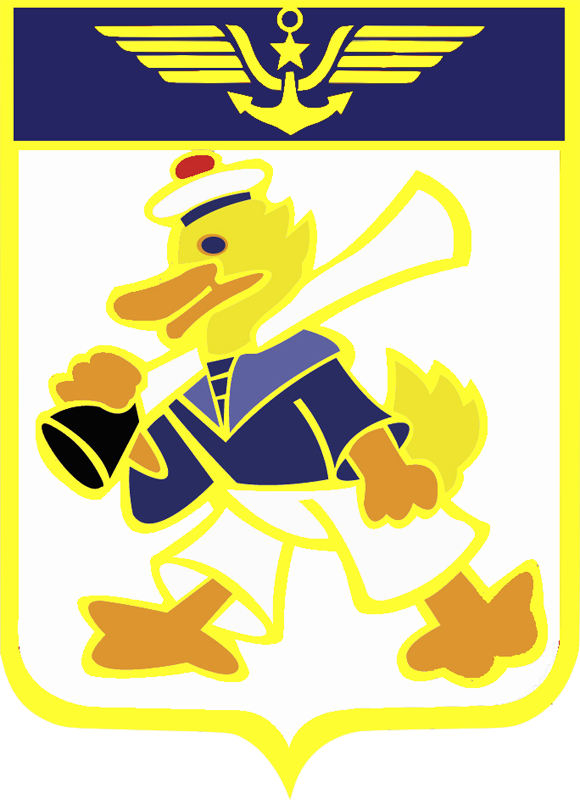
- Active: 1 August 1948 – 8 August 1963; 5 October 1964 – 15 December 1999; 18 May 2001 – present
- Country: France
- Branch: French Naval Aviation
- Garrison/HQ: BAN Landivisiau

Aircraft flown
- Fighter: Dassault Rafale M F3-R

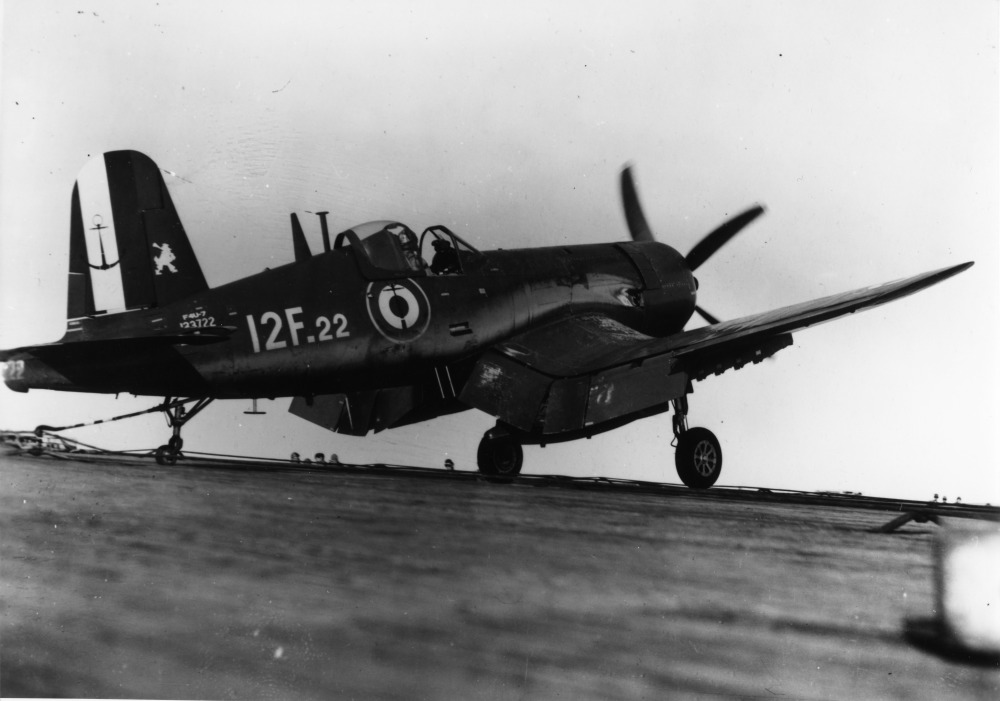
A Corsair of 12F recovers aboard an aircraft carrier.

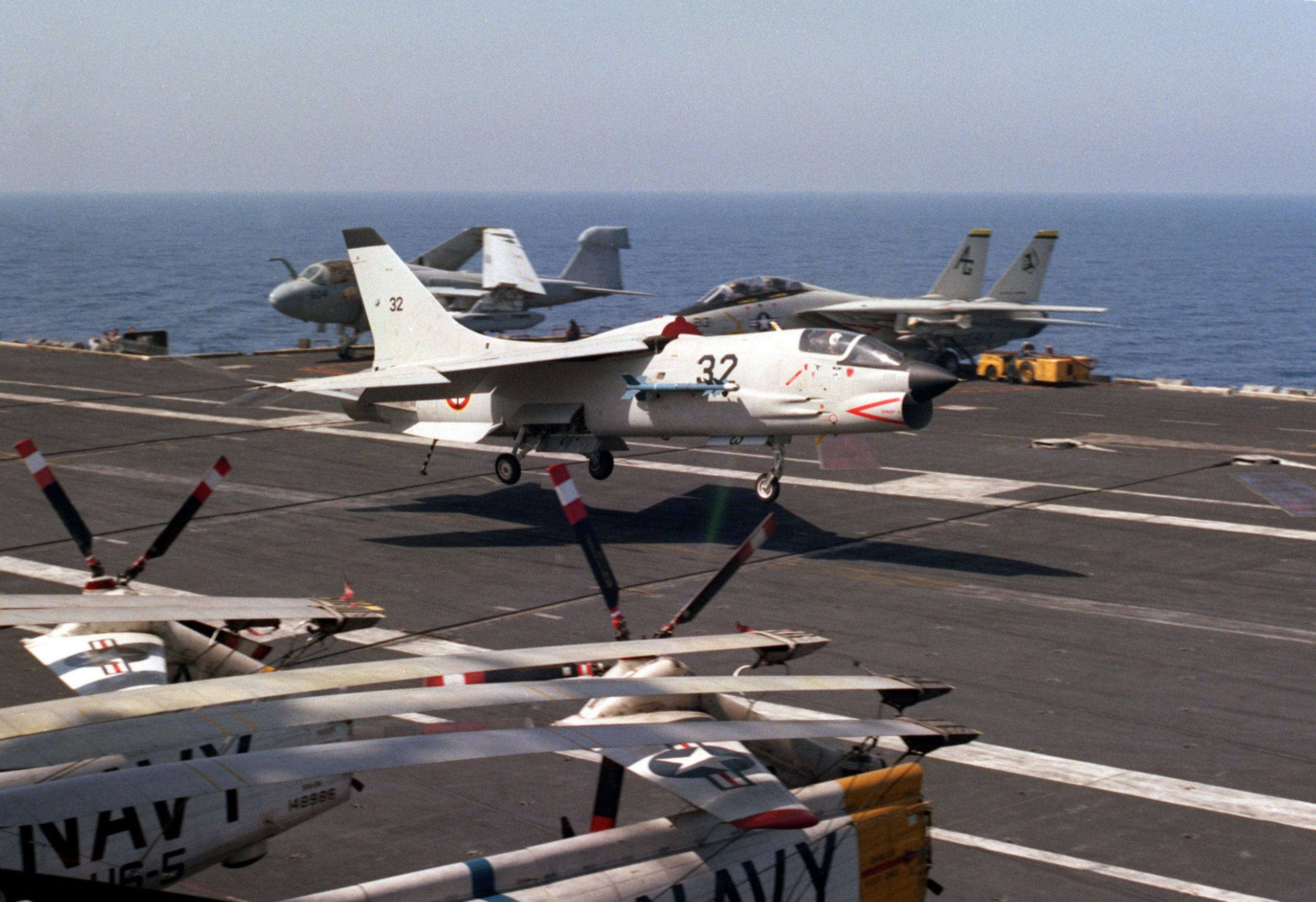
A Crusader of 12F lands aboard the US Navy aircraft carrier USS Dwight D. Eisenhower in 1983.

Flottille 12F is a unit of the Aéronavale, the air arm of the French Navy. One of three squadrons operating the Dassault Rafale, it is a carrier-based unit primarily operating in both the air defence and strike roles from the aircraft carrier Charles de Gaulle.

== History ==
Flottille 12F traces its history to 1938 and the formation of Escadrille De Chasse AC-2, initially operating the Dewoitine D.373 / 376 fighter, before converting the following year to the Potez 631, and then the Bloch MB.151. Initially seeing significant combat during the French campaign in early 1940, it was moved to North Africa in June, renamed as Escadrille 2AC (having again converted, this time to the Dewoitine D.520), where it remained until being disbanded in May 1944.

In August 1948, what had been Escadrille 2AC was reformed as Flottille 12F, to operate as a carrier-based squadron operating the Supermarine Seafire. Initially equipped with 18 aircraft, by early 1949 the squadron had lost 1/3 of its Seafires, which led to the type being banned from carrier operations and restricted to use from land bases. Flottille 12F began converting to the Grumman F6F Hellcat in 1950, undertaking conversion training in the United States during 1951. Having been declared operational, Flottille 12F was assigned to the aircraft carrier Arromanches, which was deployed to French Indochina in August 1952. During its time in Indochina, Flottille 12F operated from both Arromanches and Bois Belleau, as well as from land bases, before returning home in 1953 to convert once again, this time to the Vought F4U Corsair.

The Corsair was operated by the squadron for the next ten years, with further deployments to Indochina, as well as French Algeria during the period, until it was disbanded in August 1963. This was in preparation for it being the first Aéronavale squadron to be equipped with the Vought F-8E(FN) Crusader. 12F was reactivated in October 1964, and was deployed to the new aircraft carrier Clemenceau for the first time in April 1965. The squadron was declared operational in March 1966.

Although 12F was initially one of two Crusader squadrons formed, the second unit, Flottille 14F, which was formed in March 1965, converted to the Dassault-Breguet Super Étendard in 1978, to leave a single air defence squadron. 12F's Crusaders saw active service in a number of locales, including the Indian Ocean aboard Clemenceau between 1974 and 1977 in support of the newly independent Djibouti; operations against Libya in 1984, and to support French peacekeeping troops in Lebanon, and operations over the former Yugoslavia. Following one final deployment in the Adriatic Sea in October 1999, 12F was disbanded in December 1999.

Less than 18 months after he withdrawal of the Crusader from service, in May 2001 12F was reactivated once again, this time as the French Navy's first operational Rafale squadron.

== Operations ==
Flottille 12F is one of three squadrons operating the Rafale for the French Navy, alongside Flottille 11F and Flottille 17F. Unlike in its previous incarnation, when, while operating the Crusader, it served as the Aéronavale's only air defence squadron, the Rafale is a multirole aircraft, leading 12F to be involved in both air defence of the Charles de Gaulle carrier group, but also in strike missions launched from the carrier.

== Aircraft operated ==
- Dewoitine D.373 / 376 – October 1938 to December 1939
- Potez 631 – January 1940 to June 1940
- Bloch MB.151 – June 1940 to December 1940
- Dewoitine D.520 – December 1940 to May 1944
- Supermarine Seafire – August 1948 to April 1950
- Grumman F6F Hellcat – April 1950 to August 1953
- Vought F4U Corsair – August 1953 to August 1963
- Vought F-8E(FN) Crusader – October 1964 to December 1999
- Dassault Rafale – May 2001 to date
