= VF-162 =

Fighter Squadron 162
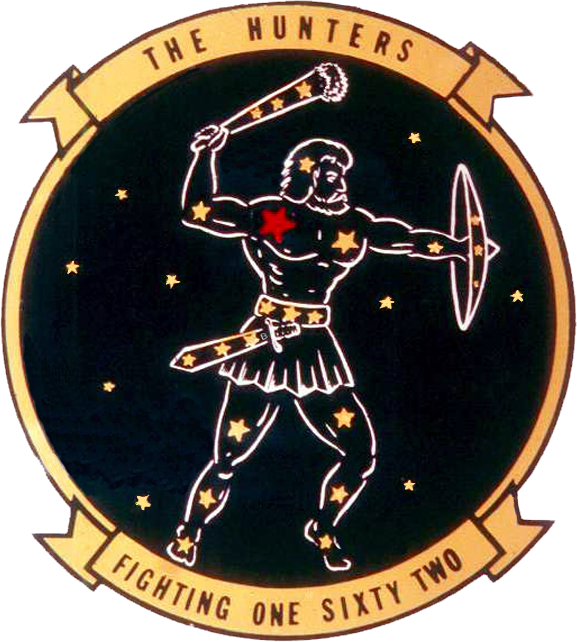
- VF-162 squadron patch
- Active: 1 September 1960 – 29 January 1971
- Country: United States
- Branch: United States Navy
- Role: Fighter aircraft
- Part of: Inactive
- Nickname: Hunters
- Engagements: Vietnam War

Aircraft flown
- Fighter: F4D-1 Skyray; F-8 Crusader

Fighter Squadron 162 or VF-162 was an aviation unit of the United States Navy established on 1 September 1960 and disestablished on 29 January 1971.

== Operational history ==
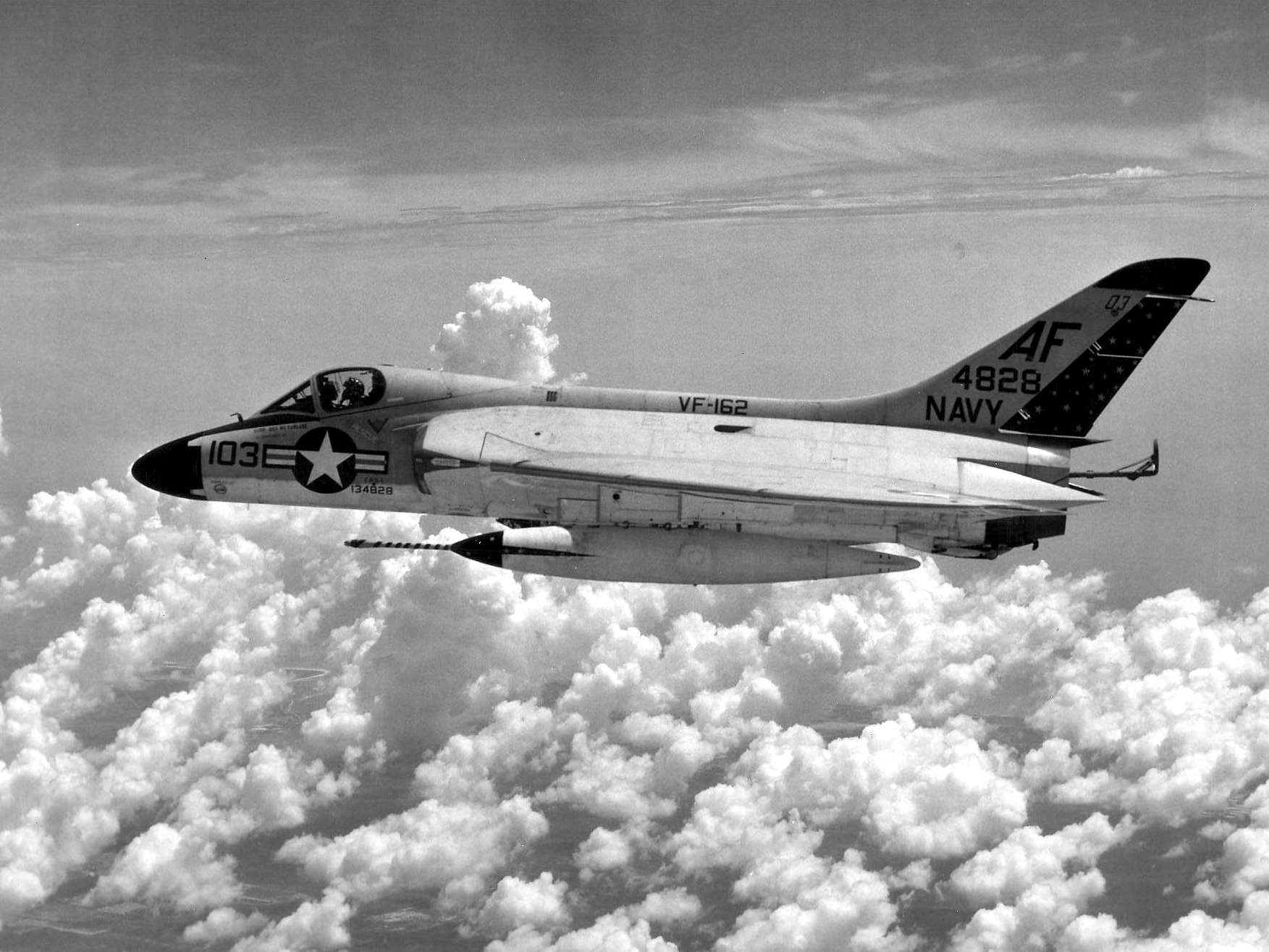
VF-162 F4D-1 Skyray in flight c.1961

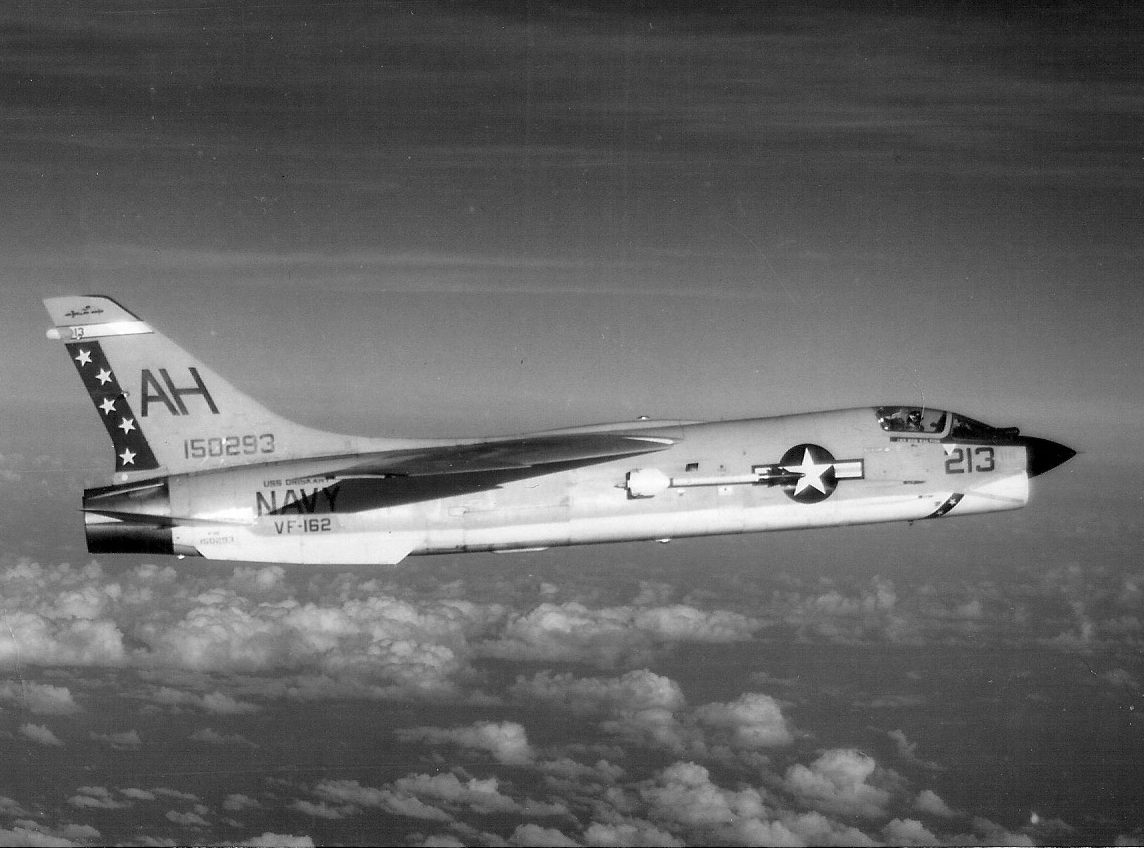
VF-162 F-8E Crusader in 1968

=== Vietnam ===
VF-162 served 6 Vietnam deployments:

- 1 August 1963 – 10 March 1964, operating F-8As from the USS Oriskany
- 5 April-16 December 1965, operating F-8Es from the USS Oriskany. On 5 October F-8E #150848 was hit by a SA-2 Guideline SAM over North Vietnam, the pilot ejected successfully and was rescued.
- 29 May-16 November 1966, operating F-8Es from the USS Oriskany. On 11 July F-8E #150902 was hit by anti-aircraft fire over North Vietnam, the pilot ejected successfully and was rescued. On 14 July F-8E #150908 was damaged in a dogfight with a Vietnam People's Air Force (VPAF) MiG, the pilot CDR Dick Bellinger ejected successfully and was rescued. On 19 July F-8E #150919 was shot down southeast of Hanoi, the pilot LT Terry Dennison was captured but died in captivity, his remains were returned in March 1974. On 6 August F-8E #150300 was hit by antiaircraft fire, the pilot ejected successfully and was rescued. On 6 October F-8E #145924 was hit by antiaircraft fire, the pilot ejected successfully and was rescued. On 9 October CDR Dick Bellinger shot down a VPAF MiG-21.
- 16 June 1967 – 31 January 1968, operating F-8Es from the USS Oriskany. On 16 July F-8E #150925 was hit by an SA-2, the pilot ejected successfully and was rescued. On 19 July F-8E #150899 was damaged by antiaircraft fire and crashed on landing, the pilot CDR Herbert Hunter was killed. On 20 July F-8E #150916 crashed into the sea on launch, the pilot ejected underwater and was rescued. On 11 September F-8E #150910 crashed due to lack of fuel the pilot ejected successfully and was rescued. On 26 October F-8E #150310 was hit by an SA-2, the pilot LTJG Charles Rice ejected successfully, was captured and released on 14 March 1973. On 14 December LT Richard Wyman shot down a VPAF MiG-17. On 4 January F-8E #150865 was hit by an SA-2, the pilot LTJG Richard Minnich was killed and his remains were returned in December 1985.
- 1 February-18 September 1969, operating F-8Js from the USS Ticonderoga
- 5 March-17 December 1970, operating F-8Hs from the USS Shangri-La. On 30 April F-8H #148650 crashed into the sea on launch the pilot ejected successfully and landed on the carrier deck. On 8 May F-8H #147916 crashed into the sea while landing, the pilot ejected successfully and was rescued. On 12 August F-8H #148660 experienced fuel problems while on a combat air patrol, the pilot ejected successfully and was rescued. On 20 October F-8H #148643 suffered engine failure on takeoff, the pilot ejected successfully and was rescued.

VF-162 had the second highest combat loss rate after VF-111 of the F-8 fighter units deployed to Vietnam.

== Home port assignments ==
The squadron was assigned to these home ports:

- NAS Miramar

== Aircraft assignment ==
- F4D-1 Skyray
- F-8A/E/J/H Crusader

== See also ==
- History of the United States Navy
- List of inactive United States Navy aircraft squadrons
- List of United States Navy aircraft squadrons
