= Super 530 =

Matra Super 530
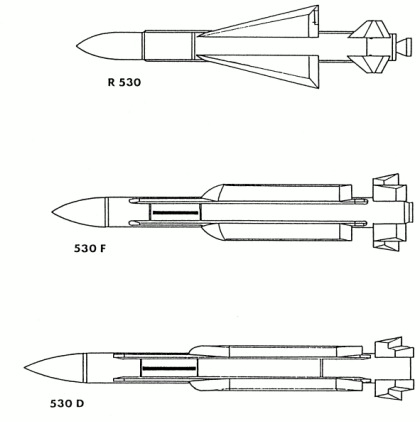
- Its predecessor, the R530, the Super 530F, and the Super 530D missiles

Specifications
- Mass: Super 530F: 245 kg (540 lb); Super 530D: 270 kg (600 lb)
- Length: Super 530F: 3.54 m (11 ft 7 in); Super 530D: 3.80 m (12 ft 6 in)
- Diameter: 263 mm (10.4 in)
- Wingspan: Super 530F: 0.88 m (2 ft 11 in); Super 530D: 0.62 m (2 ft)
- Warhead: 30 kg (66 lb) high-explosive fragmentation
- Detonation mechanism: Super 530F: RF; Super 530D: Semi-Active Radar
- Engine: Solid-fuel rocket motor
- Operational range: Super 530F: 25 km (16 mi); Super 530D: 40 km (25 mi)
- Maximum speed: Super 530F: Mach 4.5 (3,452 mph, 5,556 kmh, 3,000 kn) Super 530D: Mach <5.0 (3,836 mph, 6,174 kmh, 3,333 kn)
- Guidance system: Semi-active radar homing (SARH)

The Matra Super 530 is a French short to medium-range air-to-air missile. The Super 530 series is an improved type of the R.530 missile.

The Super 530F and Super 530D share the same general aerodynamic features and internal layout with cruciform low aspect ratio wings, cruciform aft controls, and 30 kg high explosive fragmentation warhead. However the 530D has a lengthened stainless steel body. This allows it to accommodate a more powerful dual-thrust solid propellant motor and a new seeker assembly. The new seeker includes doppler filtering for improved low altitude performance and digital micro-processing to enable the seeker to be reprogrammed against new threats.

The 530D has a claimed maximum interception altitude of 24,400 m (80,100 ft), with a snap-up capability of 12,200 m (40,000 ft), and a snap-down capability to targets at 60 m (200 ft). The missile has a range of 40 km and a maximum speed of less than Mach 5.

Super 530F is carried on the Dassault Mirage F1 which was introduced in 1979. Super 530D is carried on the Dassault Mirage 2000 which was introduced in 1988. The Super 530 is being replaced by the MICA missile.

== Operational service ==
During the Iran–Iraq War, the Iraqi Air Force used Super 530F missiles on their Mirage F1s against Iran.

On 14 September 1983, in an incident that was revealed thirty years later, two Turkish F-100Fs violated Iraqi airspace and one was shot down by an Iraqi Mirage F1EQ firing a Super 530F missile. The Turkish pilots survived and returned to Turkey.

On 15 July 2019, during a police operation in Northern Italy, a functioning Super 530F missile was seized together with firearms. The missile lacked the warhead. The weapons were smuggled by a group of people connected to far-right neo-fascist movements. The missile canister indicated it was originally sold to the Qatari armed forces. The original contract date with Qatar was October 1980.

A Super 530 missile with a live warhead was discovered at Florida's Lakeland Linder International Airport on 14 August 2020 and had to be removed by explosive ordnance disposal specialists from the U.S. Air Force's 6th Civil Engineering Squadron at nearby MacDill Air Force Base. The missile had been inadvertently shipped to the U.S. defense contractor, Draken International, LLC, an airport tenant.

== Operators ==
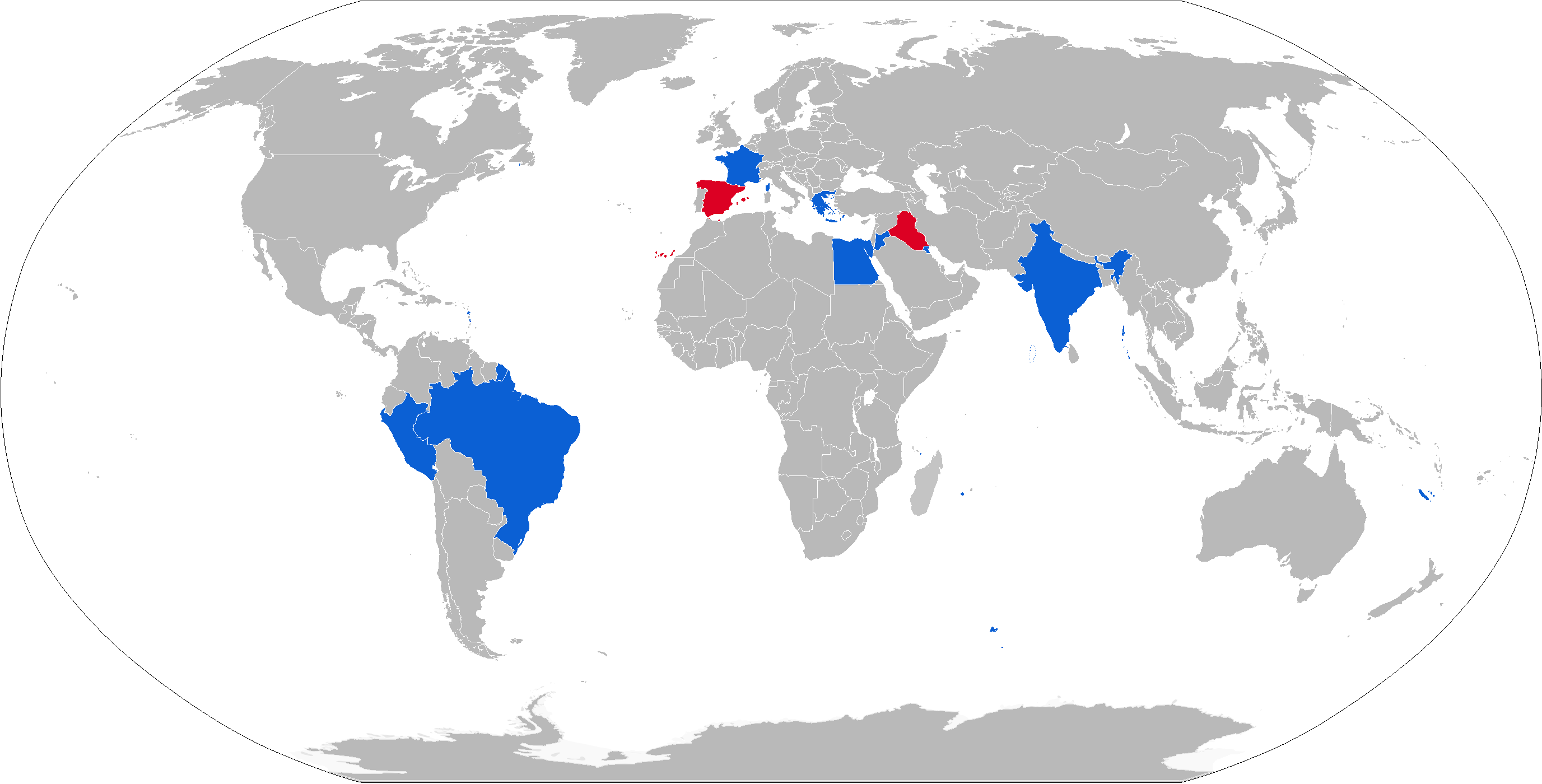
Super 530 operators: Current Former

=== Current operators ===
- Egypt
- Greece
- India

=== Former operators ===
- France
- Brazil
- Iraq Super 530F
- Spain
- Jordan
- Kuwait
- Qatar
- Libya

== Similar weapons ==
- AIM-7 Sparrow – (United States)
- R-23 – (Soviet Union)
- R-27 – (Soviet Union)
