= DFBW =

DFBW can refer to:

- Dark faced burnished ware
- Digital fly-by-wire, see Fly-by-wire#Digital_systems
- the F-8 digital fly-by-wire project
