= VFP-306 =

Light Photographic Squadron 206
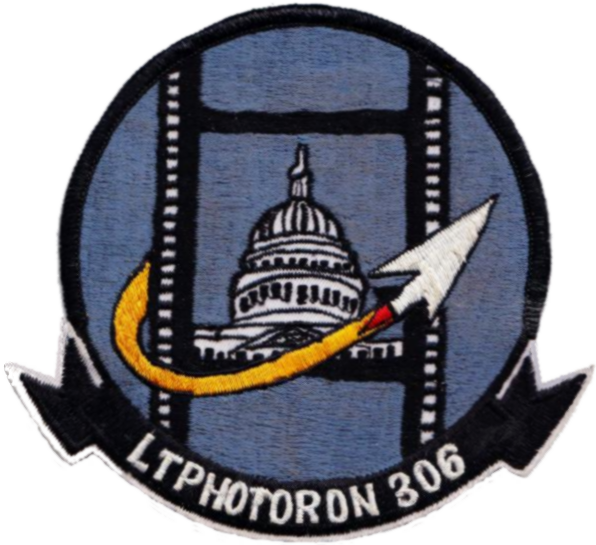
- VFP-306 squadron patch
- Active: 1 June 1970 – 30 September 1984
- Country: United States
- Branch: United States Navy Reserve
- Role: Photo-reconnaissance
- Part of: Inactive
- Nickname(s): Peeping Toms

VFP-306 was a Light Photographic Squadron of the United States Navy Reserve established on 1 June 1970. The squadron was disestablished on 30 September 1984.

== Operational history ==
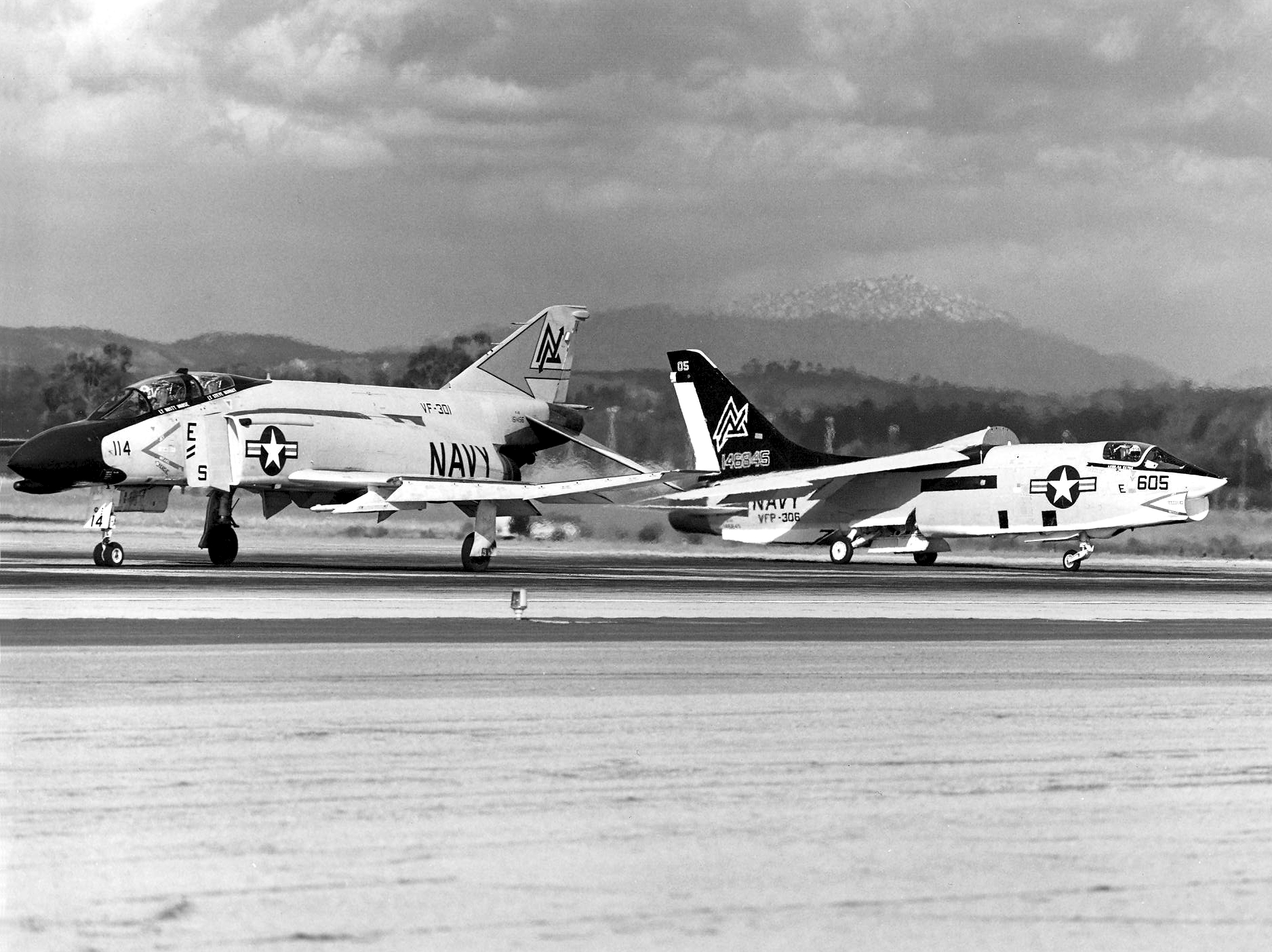
VFP-306 RF-8G Crusader and VF-301 F-4N at NAS Miramar in 1978

.

== Home port assignments ==
NAF Washington

== Aircraft assignment ==
- RF-8G Crusader

== See also ==
- Reconnaissance aircraft
- List of inactive United States Navy aircraft squadrons
- History of the United States Navy
