= F-8 digital fly-by-wire project =

Experimental fly-by-wire research project

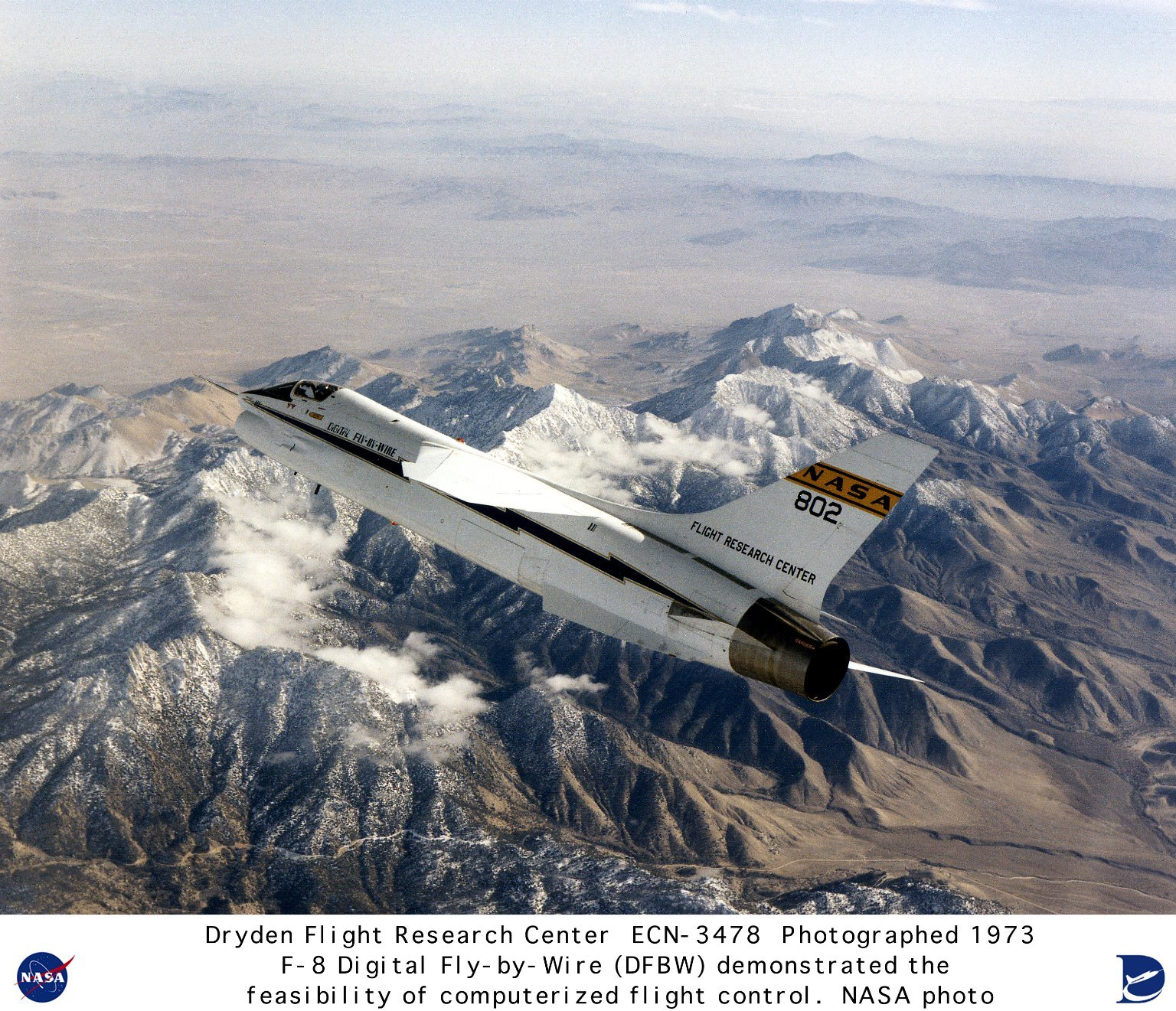
Experimental F-8 DFBW aircraft in flight, photographed in 1973

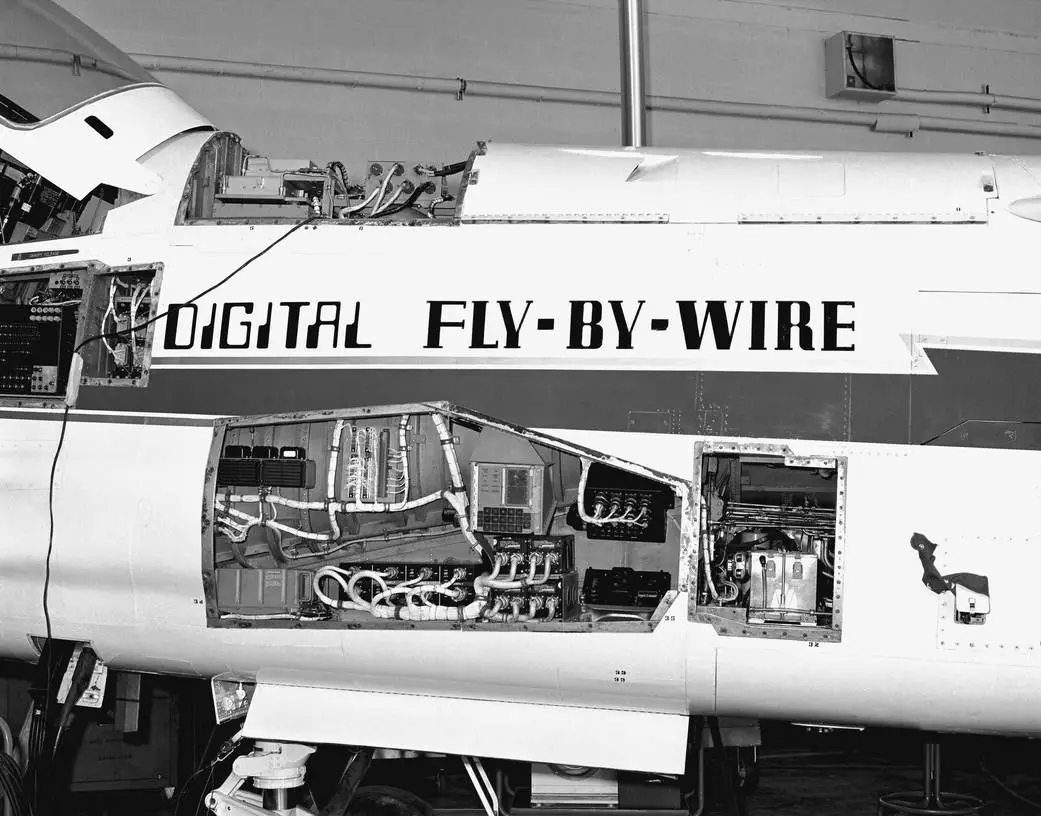
Electronics bay of the F-8 DFBW experimental aircraft. An Apollo Guidance Computer DSKY interface is visible in the gun bay.

The F-8 Digital-Fly-By-Wire (DFBW) project was an experimental digital fly-by-wire system developed by NASA at Armstrong Flight Research Center in the 1970s. It was the first digital fly-by-wire fixed-wing aircraft without a mechanical backup.

Based on a modified U.S. Navy Vought F-8C Crusader aircraft, it used a Apollo Guidance Computer as its control system. The aircraft had the tail number NASA 802.

The project was supported by Neil Armstrong, who advocated for the aircraft to be transferred to NASA.

The system originally had an analog fly-by-wire backup, but this never needed to be used.

The system's first completely digitally controlled flight was made on 25 May 1972, piloted by Gary E. Krier.

The digital system was later upgraded to a triple-redundant digital system.
