= Submarine-launched missile =

Guided missile which is launched from a submarine

A submarine-launched missile is a missile that can be launched from a submarine.

== Missiles characteristics ==
=== Missile types ===
The types of submarine launched missiles that exist include ballistic missiles, cruise missiles, hypersonic missiles, anti-submarine missiles, anti-air missiles.

=== Missile roles ===
These missiles can be used for the following missions, such as land attack, anti-ship warfare, anti-submarine warfare and anti-aircraft warfare.

=== Guidance ===
The guidance systems of the missiles are varied. They can be guided by GPS, by terrain countour matching, by inertial guidance system, astral guidance systems and infrared guidance. Those systems can be combined for more reliability and precision.

=== Warheads ===
The warheads used by those missile are:

- HE (high explosive)
- Pre-fragmented HE (high-explosive )
- Penetrative warheads
- Warhead with submunitions
- Nuclear single warhead
- Nuclear missile with multiple warheads with a MIRV system (Multiple independently targetable reentry vehicle)
- Nuclear torpedoes

== Missile launching submarines ==
=== Submarine types launching missiles ===
- Ballistic missile submarine (SSBN): these submarines launch ICBMs, usually they are large nuclear-powered submarines. But in some rare cases, diesel submarines can be adapted to launch such missiles, but few can be on the submarine.
- Cruise-missile submarine (SSGN): these submarines were developed or adapted with a primary role focused on land attack. They can send missiles with nuclear and conventional warheads, although conventional warheads are a standard.
- Nuclear-powered attack submarines (SSN) are multirole submarines that have the capability to launch several types of missiles, at the exception of ICBM. Most have used the torpedo tube to launch their missiles, although more and more, these submarines can be equipped with VLS sections. Most submarines become modular, and have the option for a section dedicated for a VLS system.
- Conventional attack submarines can launch the same type of weapons as the nuclear attack submarines, but the volume of weapons tend to be smaller. They can also be equipped with VLS systems, although a majority of the classes use the torpedo tube to launch missiles. Some small nuclear powers (North Korea, Israel, Pakistan, and in the past India) use such missiles to operate their submarine-launched nuclear cruise missiles. For these, a VLS in the sail can be used, or the torpedo tube can be used for the missile launch.
- Underwater unmanned vessels are being developed, and some might get the mission to carry and launch some missiles.

=== Submarine launching methods ===
The submarines can launch missiles in various ways:

- A torpedo tube can be used to launch cruise missiles, ballistic missiles or anti-air missiles, and anti-submarine missiles. This launching method doesn't enable to launch missiles from under the Arctic ice.
- The vertical launching system was initially developed for the launch of SLBM (Submarine-launched ballistic missile). This system has been also adapted to launch cruise missiles, and it was adapted to launch anti-air missiles. These missiles are usually launched underwater, but there is a possibility to surface, for example from under the ice to deploy the missiles.
- MANPADS can be launched from a deployed mast while the submarine is underwater.
- Small anti-air missiles can be launched from the deck once surfaced.

== Submarine-launched ballistic missiles ==
=== Conventional ballistic missiles ===
| Model | Origin | Role | Warhead type | Status | Used with | Notes |
|---|---|---|---|---|---|---|
| Hyunmoo 4-4 | South Korea | Land attack | Conventional HE warhead | In service | Dosan Ahn Changho class (KSS-III) | |

=== Conventional and nuclear-capable ballistic missiles ===
| Model | Origin | Role | Warhead type | Status | Used with | Notes |
|---|---|---|---|---|---|---|
| K-15 Or B-05 Sagarika | India | Land attack | Conventional (HE) and nuclear (single warhead) | In service | Arihant class | |

=== Nuclear ballistic missiles ===
| Model | Origin | Role | Warhead type | Status | Used with | Notes |
|---|---|---|---|---|---|---|
| JL-1 | China | Land attack | Single warhead | Retired | Modified Golf class SSB Type 092 (retired) | |
| JL-2 | China | Land attack | 1 × 1 MT warhead 3-8 × 20/90/150 kT warheads (MIRV) | In service | Type 032 Type 094 Type 094A | |
| JL-3 | China | Land attack | 1-3 × warhead (MIRV) | In service | Qing class (Type 032) Type 094 Type 094A Type 096 | |
| K-4 Kalam-4 | India | Land attack | Single warhead | In service | Arihant class | |
| K-5 | India | Land attack | MIRV warhead | Under development | Arihant class S5 class | |
| K-6 | India | Land attack | MIRV warhead | Under development | Arihant class S5 class | |
| M1 | France | Land attack | 1 × MR 41 | Retired | Redoutable class (ships Le Redoutable, Le Terrible) | |
| M2 | France | Land attack | 1 × MR 41 | Retired | Redoutable class (ships Le Redoutable, Le Terrible) | |
| M20 | France | Land attack | 1 × TN 60 1 × TN 61 successor warhead | Retired | Redoutable class (ships Le Redoutable, Le Terrible, Le Foudroyant, L'Indomptable, Le Tonnant) | Aaa |
| M4A | France | Land attack | TN-70 (6 × MIRV) | Retired | Redoutable class (ships Le Terrible, Le Foudroyant, L'Indomptable, Le Tonnant, L'Inflexible) | |
| M4B | France | Land attack | TN-71 (6 × MIRV) | Retired | Redoutable class (ships Le Terrible, Le Foudroyant, L'Indomptable, Le Tonnant, L'Inflexible) | |
| M45 | France | Land attack | TN 75 | Retired | Triomphant class (ships Le Triomphant, Le Téméraire, Le Vigilant) | |
| M51.1 | France | Land attack | TN 75 (retired, 6 × MIRV) | In service | Triomphant class (ships Le Vigilant, Le Terrible) | |
| M51.2 | France | Land attack | TNO ("Tête nucléaire océanique", 4 - 6 × MIRV) | In service | Triomphant class (ships Le Triomphant, Le Téméraire) | |
| M51.3 | France | Land attack | TNO-2 ("Tête nucléaire océanique", 6 × MIRV) | In service | SNLE 3G (future) Triomphant class | |
| M51.4 | France | Land attack | TNO-2 ("Tête nucléaire océanique", 6 × MIRV) | Under development | SNLE 3G (future) | |
| Pukguksong-1 KN-11 (US designation) | North Korea | Land attack | Single warhead | In service | Sinpo class | |
| Pukguksong-3 KN-26 (US designation) | North Korea | Land attack | Single warhead | In service | Sinpo-C class | |
| Pukguksong-4 | North Korea | Land attack | MIRV (3 warheads) | Under development | Sinpo-C class | |
| Pukguksong-5 | North Korea | Land attack | MIRV (3 warheads) | Under development | Sinpo-C class | |
| Pukguksong-6 | North Korea | Land attack | MIRV (3 warheads) | Under development | Sinpo-C class Romeo class | |
| Hwasong-11S | North Korea | Land attack | Single Hwasan-31 tactical nuclear warhead | In service | Sinpo class | |
| R-11M SS-N-1B (NATO designation) | USSR | Land attack (tactical) | Conventional (HE) and nuclear (single warhead) | Retired | Zulu IV class Zulu V class Golf I class | Submarine variant of the Scud missile. |
| R-13 SS-N-4 Sark (NATO designation) | USSR | Land attack (strategic) | Single warhead | Retired | Golf I class Hotel I class | |
| R-21 SS-N-5 Sark (NATO designation) | USSR | Land attack (strategic) | Single warhead | Retired | Golf II class Hotel II class | |
| R-27 Zyb SS-N-6 Mod1 Serb (NATO designation) | USSR | Land attack (strategic) | Single warhead or MRV (3 × warheads) | Retired | Yankee I class | |
| R-27U SS-N-6 Mod II Serb (NATO designation) | USSR | Land attack (strategic) | Single warhead or MRV (3 × warheads) | Retired | Yankee I class | |
| R-27U SS-N-6 Mod III Serb (NATO designation) | USSR | Land attack (strategic) | MRV (3 × warheads) | Retired | Yankee III class | |
| R-27K SS-NX-13 (NATO designation) | USSR | Anti-ship | Single manoeuvring warhead | Cancelled | — | |
| R-29 Vysota SS-N-8 Mod 1 Sawfly (NATO designation) | USSR | Land attack (strategic) | Single warhead | Retired | Delta I class Delta II class | |
| R-29R SS-N-18 Mod 1 Stingray (NATO designation) | USSR | Land attack (strategic) | Single warhead | Retired | Delta III class | |
| R-29RK SS-N-18 Mod 2 Stingray (NATO designation) | USSR | Land attack (strategic) | MIRV (3 × warheads) | Retired | Delta III class | |
| R-29RL SS-N-18 Mod 3 Stingray (NATO designation) | USSR | Land attack (strategic) | MIRV (7 × warheads) | Retired | Delta III class | |
| R-29RM Shtil SS-N-23 Skiff (NATO designation) | USSR | Land attack (strategic) | MIRV (4 - 10 × warheads) | In service | Delta III class Delta IV class | |
| R-29RMU2 Sineva SS-N-23A Skiff (NATO designation) | Russia | Land attack (strategic) | MIRV (4 - 10 × warheads) | In service | Delta IV class | |
| R-29RMU2.1 Layner | Russia | Land attack (strategic) | MIRV (4 - 10 × warheads) | In service | Delta IV class | |
| R-30 Bulava SS-N-32 (NATO designation) | Russia | Land attack (strategic) | MIRV (10 × warheads) | In service | Typhoon class (for testing) Borei class | |
| R-31 SS-N-17 Snipe (NATO designation) | USSR | Land attack (strategic) | Single warhead | Retired | Yankee II class | |
| R-39 Rif SS-N-20 Sturgeon (NATO designation) | USSR | Land attack (strategic) | MIRV (10 × warheads) | Retired | Typhoon class | |
| R-39M Grom SS-N-28 (NATO designation) | USSR | Land attack (strategic) | MIRV (10 × warheads) | Retired | Typhoon class | |
| UGM-27A Polaris (A1) | United States | Land attack | 1 × W47 Y1 | Retired | Ethan Allen class George Washington class | |
| UGM-27B Polaris (A2) | United States | Land attack | 1 × W47 Y1, or 1 × W47 Y2 | Retired | Ethan Allen class Lafayette class | |
| UGM-27C Polaris (A3) | United States | Land attack | W58 (3 × MIRV) | Retired | Benjamin Franklin class Ethan Allen class George Washington class James Madison class Lafayette class | |
| UGM-27C Polaris A-3 (UK variant) | United States United Kingdom | Land attack | ET.317 (3 × same target area) | Retired | Resolution class | |
| UGM-73A Poseidon (C3) | United States | Land attack | W68 (10 × W68 warheads with Mk3 MIRV) | Retired | Benjamin Franklin class James Madison class Lafayette class | |
| UGM-96A Trident I (C4) | United States | Land attack | W76-0 (up to 8 × W76 warheads with Mk4 MIRV) | Retired | Benjamin Franklin class James Madison class Ohio class | |
| UGM-133A Trident II (D5) (US variant) | United States | Land attack | W76-0 (up to 8 × W76 warheads with Mk4 MIRV), or W88 (up to 8 × W88 warheads with Mk5 MIRV) | In service | Ohio class | |
| UGM-133 Trident II (D5) (UK variant) | United States United Kingdom | Land attack | Currently: up to 8 × Holbrook warheads with Mk4/A MIRV. | In service | Vanguard class | American missile with British warheads. |
| UGM-133 Trident II (D5) (UK variant) | United States United Kingdom | Land attack | Future: up to 12 × A21 Astraea warheads with Mk-7 MIRV. | In service | Dreadnought class (future SSBN) | American missile with British warheads. |
| UGM-133 Trident II (D5LE) (US variant) | United States | Land attack | W76-1 (up to 8 × W76 warheads with Mk4A MIRV), or W76-2 (up to 8 × W76 warheads with Mk4A MIRV), or W88 (up to 8 × W88 warheads with Mk5 MIRV), or W93 (under development; up to 7 × W93 warheads with Mk7 MIRV) | In service | Columbia class Ohio class | |
| UGM-133 Trident II (D5LE2) (US variant) | United States | Land attack | W93 (under development; up to 7 × W93 warheads with Mk7 MIRV) | Under development | Columbia class | |

== Submarine-launched cruise missiles ==
=== Conventional cruise missiles ===
| Model | Origin | Role | Warhead type | Status | Used with | Notes |
|---|---|---|---|---|---|---|
| Atmaca | Turkey | Anti-ship | HE penetrating warhead | Under development | Reis class (Type 214) | |
| Harbah | Pakistan | Anti-ship | Frag/Armour-piercing | In service | Agosta class | |
| BrahMos | India Russia | Land attack / Anti-ship | Conventional (HE, submunitions) | In service | Project 75(I) (in selection) Project 76 (under development) Project 77 (under development) | |
| Exocet SM39 | France | Anti-ship | HE fragmentation warhead | In service | Agosta class Kalvari class (Scorpène variant) Redoutable class (retired) Rubis class Scorpène class Suffren class S-80 Plus class (as an option) Triomphant class | |
| Exocet SM40 | France | Anti-ship | HE fragmentation warhead | Under development | Potentially on: Orka class Scorpène class SNLE 3G Suffren class Triomphant class | |
| FC/ASW Future Cruise/Anti-Ship Weapon | France Italy United Kingdom | Land attack / Anti-ship | HE warhead | Potential submarine variant | Potentially on: Orka class Scorpène class SNLE 3G SSN-AUKUS Suffren class U212A class U212 NFS / NFS Evo class | Successor of the Harpoon, Exocet, and MdCN. |
| Gezgin | Turkey | Air, land, surface, and underwater attack | — | Under development | Reis class (Type 214) | |
| Haeseong III | South Korea | Land attack | HE warhead | In service | Dosan Ahn Changho class (KSS-III) | |
| Hyunmoo-3 C | South Korea | Land attack | HE warhead | In service | Son Won-il class (Type 214 / KSS II) | |
| Jask-2 | Iran | Anti-ship | HE warhead | In service | Fateh class Ghadir class | Small anti-ship missile |
| Jask-3 | Iran | Anti-ship | HE warhead | Under development | Fateh class Ghadir class | |
| MdCN Missile de Croisière Naval | France | Land attack | HE warhead | In service | Scorpène class Suffren class | |
| NASM-MR | India | Anti-ship | HE warhead | Under development | Project 75(I) (in selection) | |
| NSM-SL Naval Strike Missile - Submarine Launched | Norway | Land attack / Anti-ship | HE fragmentation warhead | Under development | S-80 Plus class Type 212CD Orka submarine programme Poland | |
| P-900 Alfa (3M51) | Russia | Land attack / Anti-ship | HE warhead | In service | Yasen class | |
| Type 12SM-ER | Japan | Anti-ship | HE warhead | Under development | Oyashio class Sōryū class Taigei class | |
| UGM-84 Harpoon | United States | Anti-ship | HE warhead | In service (some variants retire) | Churchill class (retired) Collins class Hai Kun class Hai Lung class (variant of the Zwaardvis class) Harushio class (retired) Jang Bogo class (Type 209 / KSS I) Los Angeles class Oyashio class Papanikolis class (Type 214) Permit class Seawolf class Shishumar class (variant of the Type 209/1500) Sohn Won-yil class (Type 214) Sōryū class Sturgeon class Swiftsure class (retired) S-80 Plus class Taigei class Tridente class (Type 214) Type 209 Victoria class (capacity lost) USS Narwhal Valiant class Virginia class Yūshio class (retired) | Exists in multiple variants, not all are used on all submarines, and some are already retired. |
| UGM-109 Tomahawk | United States | Land attack / Anti-ship | HE warhead, or submunitions warhead | In service (some variants retired, some in development) | Astute class Blekinge class (option) Los Angeles class Ohio class (SSGN) Orka class Seawolf class Sturgeon class Swiftsure class (retired - not all fitted with missile) S-80 Plus class (option) Trafalgar class (being retired) USS Narwhal Virginia class | Some missiles are launched horizontally (usually exported missiles and the early American ones) through the torpedo tube, some are launched vertically. |
| Undersea Guided Weapon programme | United Kingdom | Anti-ship | — | Cancelled | Valiant class Swiftsure class | |
| YJ-82 | China | Anti-ship | HE fragmentation warhead | In service | Type 035 Type 039 Type 091 Type 093 Hangor class | Submarine-launched version of the YJ-8. |
| YJ-18 | China | Anti-ship / anti-radiation | HE fragmentation warhead | In service | Type 093 Type 039 Type 039A Type 041 Type 095 | |
| 3M54 Kalibr SS-N-27 Sizzler (NATO designation) | USSR | Land attack | HE warhead | In service | Akula class Amur class (option) Borei class Improved Kilo class Lada class Oscar II class Sindhughosh class Yasen class | Submarine-launched Version of the Kalibr missile. |
| 3SM Tryffing Super Sonic Strike Missile | Norway Germany | Land attack / Anti-ship | — | Potential submarine variant | Type 212CD class | |
| — | Japan | Land attack / Anti-ship | — | Under development | Sōryū class Taigei class | Developed by MHI, derived from the Type 12 SSM. Study to equip the Japanese submarines with VLS. |

=== Conventional and nuclear-capable cruise missiles ===
| Model | Origin | Role | Warhead type | Status | Used with | Notes |
|---|---|---|---|---|---|---|
| Nirbhay NGSLCM Next generation submarine launched cruise missile | India | Land attack / Anti-ship | Conventional (HE, submunitions) and nuclear (single warhead) | Under development | Project 75(I) (in selection) Project 77 (under development) Sindhughosh class (trials) | |
| P-6 Progress SS-N-3A Shaddock (NATO designation) | USSR | Anti-ship | Conventional (4G48 shape charge warhead) and nuclear (single 20 kT warhead) | Retired | Echo II class Juliett class | Submarine variant of the P-35 missile. |
| P-70 Ametist SS-N-7 Starbright (NATO designation) | USSR | Anti-ship | Conventional and nuclear (single warhead) | Retired | Charlie I class | |
| P-120 Malakhit SS-N-9 Siren (NATO designation) | USSR | Anti-ship | Conventional and nuclear (single warhead) | Retired | Charlie II class | Submarine launched variant retired. |
| P-500 Bazalt SS-N-12 Sandbox (NATO designation) | USSR | Anti-ship | Conventional (HE) and nuclear (single warhead) | Retired | Echo II class Juliett class | Submarine launched variant retired. |
| P-1000 Vulkan SS-N-12 Sandbox (NATO designation) | USSR | Anti-ship | Conventional (HE) and nuclear (single warhead) | Retired | Echo II class | Submarine launched variant retired. |
| P-700 Granit SS-N-19 Shipwreck (NATO designation) | USSR | Anti-ship | Conventional (HE) and nuclear (single warhead) | In service | Oscar I class Oscar II class | |
| P-800 Bolid SS-N-26 Strobile (NATO designation) | Russia | Land attack / Anti-ship | Conventional (HE) and nuclear (single warhead) | In service | Yasen class | Submarine-launched Version of the P-800 Oniks. |
| Popeye Turbo | Israel | Land attack / Anti-ship | Conventional (HE, explosive penetrator) and nuclear (single warhead) | Speculated | Dakar class Dolphin I class Dolphin II class | |
| 3M-14 Kalibr SS-N-30A (NATO designation) | Russia | Land attack | Conventional (HE) and nuclear (single warhead) | In service | Akula class Amur class (option) Borei class Improved Kilo class Lada class Oscar II class Yasen class | Improved variant of the 3M54 Klub. |

=== Nuclear cruise missiles ===
| Model | Origin | Role | Warhead type | Status | Used with | Notes |
|---|---|---|---|---|---|---|
| Babur III | Pakistan | Land attack | 1 × warhead | In service | Hashmat class (Agosta 70A) Khalid class (Agosta 90B) Hangor class | |
| Pulhwasal-3-31 | North Korea | Land attack | 1 × warhead (Hwasan-31) | In service | Romeo class | |
| P-5 Pyatyorka SS-N-3C Shaddock (NATO designation) | USSR | Land attack (strategic) | Single warhead | Retired | Echo II class Juliett class Whiskey conversion class | |
| P-750 Grom SS-NX-27 Scotpion (NATO designation) | USSR | Land attack / Anti-ship | Nuclear (single warhead) | Cancelled | Echo II class | Derived from the Kh-80 Meteorit-A. |
| S-10 Granat SS-N-21 Sampson (NATO designation) | USSR | Land attack (strategic) | Single warhead | In service | Akula class Delta class Sierra I class Sierra II class Victor III class Yankee Notch class (retired) | Submarine variant of the RK-55 Relief. |
| SLCM-N | United States | Land attack | — | Under development | Los Angeles class Virginia class | |
| SSM-N-2 Triton | United States | Land attack | Single warhead (W27) | Cancelled | — | Submarine variant was redundant with Regulus, therefore cancelled. |
| SSM-N-6 Rigel | United States | Land attack | Single warhead (W5) | Cancelled | — | Submarine variant was redundant with Regulus, therefore cancelled. |
| SSM-N-8 Regulus | United States | Land attack | Single warhead (W5 or W27) | Retired | Balao class (USS Barbero) Gato class (USS Tunny) Grayback class USS Halibut | |
| SSM-N-9 Regulus II | United States | Land attack | Single warhead (W27) | Retired | Gato class (USS Tunny) Grayback class USS Halibut | |
| Unknown Israel nuclear missile | Israel | Land attack | 1 × warhead | In service | Dakar class Dolphin II class | |

== Submarine launched hypersonic missiles ==
=== Conventional hypersonic missiles ===
| Model | Origin | Role | Warhead type | Status | Used with | Notes |
|---|---|---|---|---|---|---|
| BrahMos-II | India Russia | Land attack / Anti-ship | Conventional (HE, submunitions) | Under development | Project 75(I) (in selection) Project 76 (under development) Project 77 (under development) | |
| 3M22 Zircon SS-N-33 (NATO designation) | Russia | Land attack / Anti-ship | Conventional (HE) | In service | Yasen-M class | |

== Submarine launched anti-submarine missiles ==
=== Conventional anti-submarine missiles ===
| Model | Origin | Role | Warhead type | Status | Used with | Notes |
|---|---|---|---|---|---|---|
| UUM-125B Sea Lance | United States | Anti-submarine | Mark 50 homing torpedo | Cancelled | Los Angeles class Seawolf class | |
| 91R Otvet | Russia | Anti-submarine | APR-3M homing rocket torpedo | In service | Yasen class Future: Laika class | Part of the Kalibr missile family. Originally designed under designation 91RE1 as part of Club-S (export designation for submarine-launched Kalibr) to be used on exported Kilo-class submarines. Although Club-S is installed on those submarines, usage of the Otvet/91RE1 is unknown. |

=== Conventional and nuclear capable anti-submarine missiles ===
| Model | Origin | Role | Warhead type | Status | Used with | Notes |
|---|---|---|---|---|---|---|
| RPK-2 Vyuga (533 mm) SS-N-15 Starfish (NATO designation) | USSR | Anti-submarine | 82R torpedo, or 90R nuclear depth charge | In service | Akula class Alfa class Borei class Delta class Tango class Typhoon class | |
| RPK-2 Vyuga (650 mm) SS-N-15 Starfish (NATO designation) | USSR | Anti-submarine | 83R torpedo, or 86R nuclear depth charge | In service | Akula class Oscar class Sierra I class Sierra II class | |
| RPK-6 Vodopad (533 mm) SS-N-16A Stallion (NATO designation) | USSR | Anti-submarine / anti-ship | UMGT -1 torpedo, or 84R or 84RN nuclear depth charge | Akula, Sierra and Typhoon | Akula class Alfa class Borei class Lada class Typhoon class | |
| RPK-7 Veter (650 mm) SS-N-16B Stallion (NATO designation) | USSR | Anti-submarine / anti-ship | UMGT -1 torpedo, or 88R nuclear depth charge | Akula, Sierra and Typhoon | Akula class Oscar class Sierra I class Sierra II class | |

=== Nuclear anti-submarine missiles ===
| Model | Origin | Role | Warhead type | Status | Used with | Notes |
|---|---|---|---|---|---|---|
| UUM-44 SUBROC | United States | Anti-submarine | W55 nuclear depth charge | Retired | Permit class Sturgeon class USS Narwhal | |
| UUM-125A Sea Lance | United States | Anti-submarine | W89 nuclear depth charge | Cancelled | Los Angeles class Seawolf class | |

== Submarine launched anti-air missiles ==
This is a list of anti-aircraft warfare missiles that are, will or were used on submarines.

Not included are MANPADS (9K32 Strela-2, 9K34 Strela-3, 9K38 Igla) used by Russian/Soviet submariners, which requires exposing the conning tower and a dedicated submariner holding the launcher to launch.

| Model | Origin | Role | Status | Used with | Notes |
|---|---|---|---|---|---|
| IDAS Interactive Defence and Attack System for Submarines | Germany Norway Turkey | SHORAD Short-range air-defence | Under development | Type 212A Type 212CD | Underwater launch. |
| MICA (A3SM) | France | SHORAD Short-range air-defence | Under development | Potentially on: Orka class Scorpène class SNLE 3G Suffren class | Underwater launch. |
| Mistral (A3SM) | France | V/SHORAD Very short-range air-defence | Under development | Potentially on: Orka class Scorpène class SNLE 3G Suffren class | Low depth launch with a deployed mast above water. |
| Blowfish | United Kingdom | V/SHORAD Very short-range air-defence | Retired | Gal class (temporarily) | Low depth launch, 6 missiles on a mast that could be raised from the submarine's conning tower. |
