= Polymer-bonded explosive =

Explosive materials where powder is bound together in a matrix with synthetic polymer

Polymer-bonded explosives, also called PBX or plastic-bonded explosives, are explosive materials in which explosive powder is bound together in a matrix using small quantities (typically 5–10% by weight) of a synthetic polymer. PBXs are normally used for explosive materials that are not easily melted into a casting, or are otherwise difficult to form.

PBX was first developed in 1952 at Los Alamos National Laboratory, as RDX embedded in polystyrene with diisooctyl phthalate (DEHP) plasticizer. HMX compositions with teflon-based binders were developed in 1960s and 1970s for gun shells and for Apollo Lunar Surface Experiments Package (ALSEP) seismic experiments, although the latter experiments are usually cited as using hexanitrostilbene (HNS).

== Potential advantages ==
Polymer-bonded explosives have several potential advantages:

- If the polymer matrix is an elastomer (rubbery material), it tends to absorb shocks, making the PBX very insensitive to accidental detonation, and thus ideal for insensitive munitions.
- Hard polymers can produce PBX that is very rigid and maintains a precisely engineered shape even under severe stress.
- PBX powders can be pressed into a desired shape at room temperature; casting normally requires hazardous melting of the explosive. High pressure pressing can achieve density for the material very close to the theoretical crystal density of the base explosive material.
- Many PBXes are safe to machine; turning solid blocks into complex three-dimensional shapes. For example, a billet of PBX can be precisely shaped on a lathe or CNC machine. This technique is used to machine explosive lenses necessary for modern nuclear weapons.

== Binders ==
=== Fluoropolymers ===
Fluoropolymers are advantageous as binders due to their high density (yielding high detonation velocity) and inert chemical behavior (yielding long shelf stability and low aging). They are somewhat brittle, as their glass transition temperature is at room temperature or above. This limits their use to insensitive explosives (e.g. TATB) where the brittleness does not have detrimental effects on safety. They are also difficult to process.

=== Elastomers ===
Elastomers have to be used with more mechanically sensitive explosives like HMX. The elasticity of the matrix lowers sensitivity of the bulk material to shock and friction; their glass transition temperature is chosen to be below the lower boundary of the temperature working range (typically below -55 °C). Crosslinked rubber polymers are however sensitive to aging, mostly by action of free radicals and by hydrolysis of the bonds by traces of water vapor. Rubbers like Estane or hydroxyl-terminated polybutadiene (HTPB) are used for these applications extensively. Silicone rubbers and thermoplastic polyurethanes are also in use.

Fluoroelastomers, e.g. Viton, combine the advantages of both.

=== Energetic polymers ===
Energetic polymers (e.g. nitro or azido derivates of polymers) can be used as a binder to increase the explosive power in comparison with inert binders. Energetic plasticizers can be also used. The addition of a plasticizer lowers the sensitivity of the explosive and improves its processibility.

== Insults (potential explosive inhibitors) ==
Explosive yields can be affected by the introduction of mechanical loads or the application of temperature; such damages are called insults. The mechanism of a thermal insult at low temperatures on an explosive is primarily thermomechanical, at higher temperatures it is primarily thermochemical.

=== Thermomechanical ===
Thermomechanical mechanisms involve stresses by thermal expansion (namely differential thermal expansions, as thermal gradients tend to be involved), melting/freezing or sublimation/condensation of components, and phase transitions of crystals (e.g. transition of HMX from beta phase to delta phase at 175 °C involves a large change in volume and causes extensive cracking of its crystals).

=== Thermochemical ===
Thermochemical changes involve decomposition of the explosives and binders, loss of strength of binder as it softens or melts, or stiffening of the binder if the increased temperature causes crosslinking of the polymer chains. The changes can also significantly alter the porosity of the material, whether by increasing it (fracturing of crystals, vaporization of components) or decreasing it (melting of components). The size distribution of the crystals can be also altered, e.g. by Ostwald ripening. Thermochemical decomposition starts to occur at the crystal nonhomogeneities, e.g. intragranular interfaces between crystal growth zones, on damaged parts of the crystals, or on interfaces of different materials (e.g. crystal/binder). Presence of defects in crystals (cracks, voids, solvent inclusions...) may increase the explosive's sensitivity to mechanical shocks.

== Some example PBXs ==
Some example PBXs
Name	Explosive ingredients	Inert ingredients	Usage
AFX-757	RDX 25%, ammonium perchlorate 30%, aluminium 33%	HTPB 4.44%, dioctyl adipate 6.56%	Used in warheads for JASSM, GBU-39 Small Diameter Bomb and similar weapons. Has high air blast equivalent, 1.39 times more than Composition B, but low brisance due to low high explosive content.
EDC-8	PETN 76%	RTV silicone 24%	
EDC-28	RDX 94%	FPC 461 6%	
EDC-29	β-HMX 95%	HTPB 5%	UK composition
EDC-32	HMX 85%	15% Viton A 15%	
EDC-37	HMX 91%, NC 1%	K-10 liquid 8%	
LX-04	HMX 85%	Viton-A 15%	High-velocity; nuclear weapons (W62, W70)
LX-07	HMX 90%	Viton-A 10%	High-velocity; nuclear weapons (W71)
LX-08	PETN 63.7%	Sylgard 182 (silicone rubber) 34.3%, 2% Cab-O-Sil	
LX-09-0	HMX 93%	2,2-dinitropropyl acrylate (pDNPA) 4.6%; FEFO 2.4%	High-velocity; nuclear weapons (W68). Prone to deterioration and separation of the plasticizer and binder. Caused serious safety problems. FEFO is 1,1-[methylenebis(oxy)]-bis-[2-fluoro-2,2-dinitroethane], liquid explosive.
LX-09-1	HMX 93.3%	pDNPA 4.4%; FEFO 2.3%	
LX-10-0	HMX 95%	Viton-A 5%	High-velocity; nuclear weapons (W68 (replaced LX-09), W70, W79, W82)
LX-10-1	HMX 94.5%	Viton-A 5.5%	
LX-11-0	HMX 80%	Viton-A 20%	High-velocity; nuclear weapons (W71)
LX-14-0	HMX 95.5%	Estane & 5702-Fl 4.5%	
LX-15	HNS 95%	Kel-F 800 5%	
LX-16	PETN 96%	FPC461 4%	FPC461 is a vinyl chloride:chlorotrifluoroethylene copolymer and its response to gamma rays has been studied.
LX-17-0	TATB 92.5%	Kel-F 800 7.5%	High-velocity, insensitive; nuclear weapons (B83, W84, W87, W89)
PBX 9007	RDX 90%	Polystyrene 9.1%; DOP 0.5%; rosin 0.4%	
PBX 9010	RDX 90%	Kel-F 3700 10%	High-velocity; nuclear weapons (W50, B43)
PBX 9011	HMX 90%	Estane and 5703-Fl 10%	High-velocity; nuclear weapons (B57 mods 1 and 2)
PBX 9205	RDX 92%	Polystyrene 6%; DOP 2%	Created in 1947 at Los Alamos, later given the PBX 9205 designation.
PBX 9404	HMX 94%, NC 3%	Tris(b-chloroethyl)phosphate (CEF) 3%	High-velocity; nuclear weapons, widely used (B43, W48, W50, W55, W56, B57 mod 2, B61 mods 0, 1, 2, 5, W69). Serious safety problems related to aging and decomposition of the nitrocellulose binder.
PBX 9407	RDX 94%	FPC461 6%	
PBX 9501	HMX 95%, BDNPA-F 2.5%	Estane 2.5%	High-velocity; nuclear weapons (W76, W78, W88). One of the most extensively studied high explosive formulations. BDNPA-F is 1:1 mixture of bis(2,2-dinitropropyl) acetal and bis(2,2-dinitropropyl) formal.
PBS 9501	-	Estane 2.5%; BDNPA-F 2.5%; sieved white sugar 95%	Inert simulant of mechanical properties of PBX 9501
PBX 9502	TATB 95%	Kel-F 800 5%	High-velocity, insensitive; principal in recent US nuclear weapons (B61 mods 3, 4, 6–10, W80, W85, B90, W91), backfitted to earlier warheads to replace less safe explosives.
PBX 9503	TATB 80%; HMX 15%	Kel-F 800 5%	Also known as X-0351.
PBX 9604	RDX 96%	Kel-F 800 4%	
PBXN-101	HMX 82%		
PBXN-102	HMX 59%, Aluminum 23%		
PBXN-103	Ammonium perchlorate (AP) 40%, Aluminum 27%, TMETN 23%	TEGDN 2.5%	Mk 48 torpedoes
PBXN-104	HMX 70%		
PBXN-105	RDX 7%, AP 49.8%, Aluminum 25.8%		
PBXN-106	RDX 75%	polyethylene glycol/BDNPA-F binder	Naval shells
PBXN-107	RDX 86%	polyacrylate binder	BGM-109 Tomahawk missiles
PBXN-109	RDX 64%, Aluminum 20%	HTPB, DOA (dioctyladipate), and IPDI (isophorone diisocyanate)	Used in some versions of the Mark 82, Mark 83 and Mark 84 general-purpose bombs.
PBXN-110	HMX 88%	5.4% Polybutadiene, 5% Isodecylpelargonate	
PBXN-111	RDX 20%, AP 43%, Aluminum 25%		
PBXW-114	HMX 78%, Aluminum 10%		
PBXW-115	RDX 20%, AP 43%, Aluminum 25%		
PBXN-1	RDX 68%, Aluminum 20%		
PBXN-3	RDX 85%	Nylon	AIM-9X Sidewinder Missile
PBXN-4	Diaminotrinitrobenzene (DATB) 94%		
PBXN-5	HMX 95%	fluoroelastomer 5%	Naval shells
PBXN-6	RDX 95%		
PBXN-7	RDX 35%, TATB 60%		
PBXN-9	HMX 92%	HYTEMP 4454 2%, Diisooctyl adipate (DOA) 6%	
XTX 8003	PETN 80%	Sylgard 182 (silicone rubber) 20%	High-velocity, extrudable; nuclear weapons (W68, W76)
XTX 8004	RDX 80%	Sylgard 182 (silicone rubber) 20%	
