= American naval ballistic systems =

American submarine-launched ballistic missile systems during the Cold War

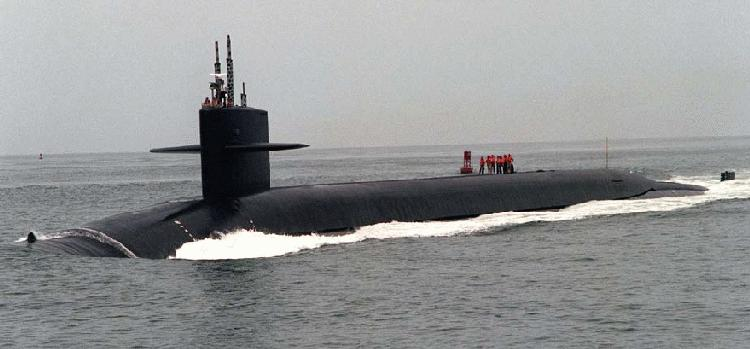
American SSBN ship

The development of submarine-launched ballistic missile (SLBM) systems was a critical aspect of the Cold War arms race between the United States and the Soviet Union. These systems, deployed on nuclear-powered submarines (SSBNs), were at the forefront of technological competition between the two superpowers, driving advancements in both military and civilian technologies, including space exploration. The rivalry shaped the design, automation, and operational tactics of these systems, reflecting the distinct economic, scientific, political, ideological, and cultural characteristics of each nation. While both countries pursued similar strategic goals, their approaches to SLBM development diverged significantly, with each responding to the other's technological advancements.

Technologically, the United States favored solid-fuel rocket engines for their SLBMs. The United States Navy emphasized human control, particularly over nuclear reactors, prioritizing stealth through noise reduction. The nation achieved significant innovations, occasionally gaining advantages in specific technical areas. SLBM systems were the most effective means of strategic nuclear deterrence, forming a cornerstone of their respective nuclear triads, alongside land-based missiles and strategic bombers, except during the early Cold War period.

== Origins ==
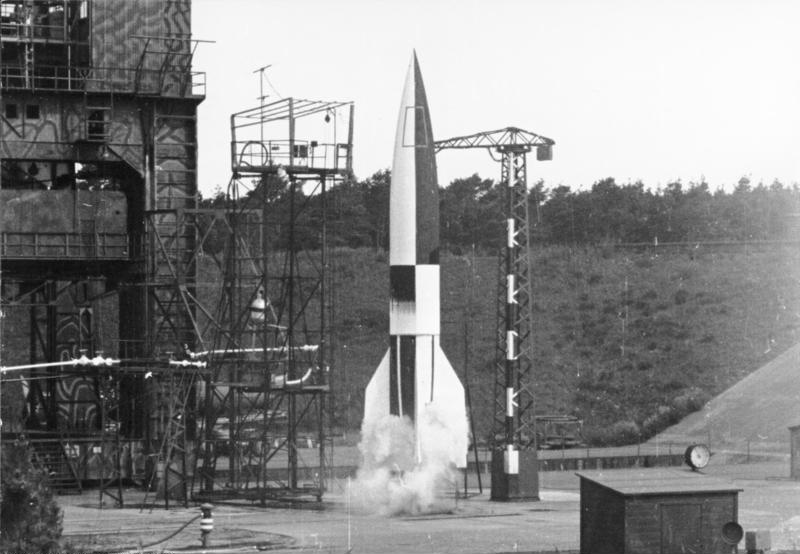
V-2 missile

The concept of submarine-launched ballistic missiles is related to the German V-2 rocket program during World War II. In 1944, Klaus Riedel, a member of the Peenemünde research team, proposed launching V-2 rockets from the North Sea against Great Britain, using submarines to tow launch containers. These containers, approximately 32 meters long, 5.7 meters in diameter, and with a displacement of 500 tons, housed a single V-2 missile, crew quarters, a control center, and fuel and ballast tanks. A single submarine could tow up to three containers. Plans also included towing containers across the Atlantic to target New York City. The crew would travel aboard the submarine, transfer to the container for fueling, and launch the missile. The project, developed at the AG Vulcan Stettin shipyard in Szczecin, reached 65–70% completion for three containers by the war's end, with a prototype tested near Peenemünde.

After the war, many German V-2 scientists, including Wernher von Braun, were recruited by the United States to bolster its ballistic missile program under the United States Army. In October 1946, the NKVD arrested approximately 5,000 German specialists, relocating them to the Soviet Union to advance Soviet ballistic missile development. As a result, the German V-2 designers made a significant contribution to both the American and Soviet ballistic missile programs.

== First-generation systems ==
Starting in October 1945, the United Kingdom, the United States, and the Soviet Union began a series of tests on captured or assembled V-2 missiles. On 6 September 1947, an "American" V-2 was launched from the deck of the aircraft carrier USS Midway (CV-41), marking the first-ever launch of a ballistic missile from a mobile platform. From that point on, guided missile ships – vessels capable of carrying and launching rockets – became a priority for the United States Navy. The first such vessels were to be multi-role aircraft carriers, capable of both carrying ballistic weapons and fulfilling the usual functions of this class, as well as the unfinished battleship USS Kentucky (BB-66) and the large cruiser USS Hawaii (CB-3). The United States was aware of the German concept of underwater missile launchers, but showed little interest in this idea at the time, placing greater hopes in sea-launched cruise missiles for long-range strikes. The newly formed Air Force (United States Air Force) conducted research in ballistic technology, competing with the United States Army's program led by von Braun.

After launching a V-2 rocket from the aircraft carrier Midway in 1947, the United States Navy paid little attention to ballistic missiles, focusing instead on other types of new weaponry – particularly those related to aircraft carriers. One of the few instances of interest from the United States Navy in ballistic missile weaponry during this period came in 1950, when Commander Francis D. Boyle – a World War II submarine commander – proposed adapting existing submarines into guided missile submarines. This innovative idea included, among other things, vertical launch tubes and replacing traditional propeller-based propulsion with pump-jets. However, no ballistic missile program was undertaken by the United States Navy at that time.

The idea gained momentum only after the Soviet Union conducted a hydrogen bomb test on 12 August 1953. Fear of Soviet advancements in strategic missile technology pushed the United States Department of Defense to order the Navy to join the United States Army's IRBM (Intermediate-Range Ballistic Missile) program. In the Navy's case, the missile would be launched from surface ships. Naval leadership, however, was highly skeptical of joining the Army's program, which involved the liquid-fueled Jupiter missile. This fuel was considered too hazardous for handling at sea. The missile itself, measuring 18.3 metres, was also thought to be too unwieldy even aboard a surface vessel.

At the time, the Navy had two additional unofficial reasons for its reluctance to pursue a ballistic missile program. First, since the late 1940s, the Bureau of Aeronautics and the Bureau of Ordnance had each been independently developing cruise missile programs (for submarines) intended for land-attack missions. Neither bureau was willing to divert its scientific and engineering resources to a ballistic missile initiative. The second unofficial reason stemmed from the Navy's bitter loss in a high-profile inter-service rivalry with the Air Force over the B-36 bomber versus the United States-class aircraft carriers. This defeat cost the Navy significant prestige and led to the cancellation of the United States carrier program, an episode known as the "Revolt of the Admirals". As a result, Navy leadership wanted to avoid another inter-branch conflict – this time over ballistic missiles. A further and more tangible reason for resistance was concern over the financial burden of developing a new class of weapons outside the Navy's regular budget. Tensions reached a point where Admiral Robert Carney, Chief of Naval Operations from 1953 to 1955, imposed restrictions on naval officers who supported the ballistic missile program.

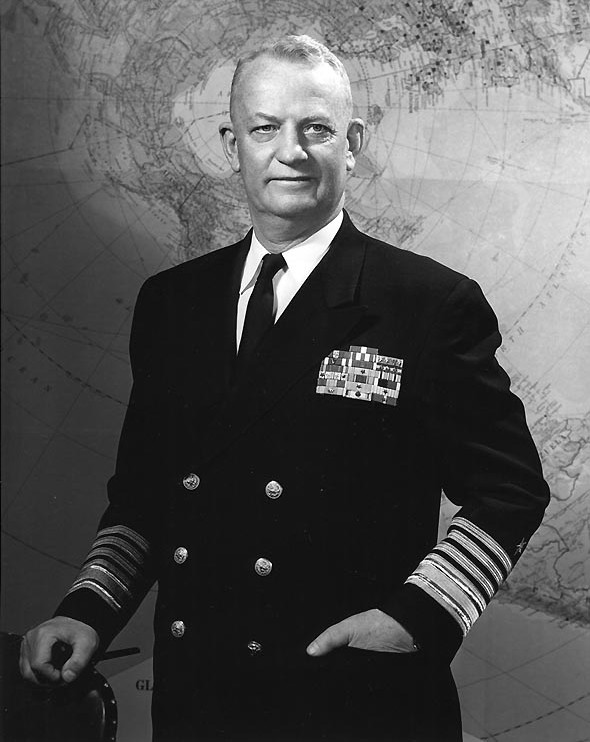
Admiral Arleigh Burke

The position of the United States Navy toward the ballistic missile program changed when Admiral Arleigh Burke assumed the post of Chief of Naval Operations. According to the admiral's biographer, David A. Rosenberg, Burke's support – despite internal opposition within the Navy – for granting the Navy's ballistic missile program the highest priority was the most significant initiative of his first term in that office, from 1955 to 1957. Despite this backing, the intermediate-range ballistic missile (IRBM) program for the fleet did not develop well, primarily due to resistance from Navy bureaucracy. Seeking to elevate the program's status and accelerate work on the Navy's own missile, the admiral established the Special Projects Office (SPO), independent of other technical bureaus, with the sole task of developing a sea-based ballistic missile. In these efforts, Admiral Burke had strong support from Secretary of the Navy Charles S. Thomas. On 8 November 1955, the Secretary of Defense launched a joint Army-Navy IRBM program. The Navy's portion of the Jupiter missile project, along with the Air Force's Atlas ICBM program, was granted the highest national priority – Brickbat 01. Work on the naval version of the Jupiter missile gained momentum in 1956, and the deployment of the first missiles aboard modified commercial ships was scheduled for 1959.

On 8 February 1957, Chief of Naval Operations Arleigh Burke established the requirements for the developing ballistic missiles, which were to have a range of 1,500 nautical miles (2,778 km) and be ready for operational use by 1965. This range was calculated to enable an attack on the Soviet capital – Moscow – from a submarine positioned in the Norwegian Sea. However, due to Soviet progress in developing strategic rocket weapons, the Polaris program was repeatedly accelerated. Admiral Burke funded it from the regular United States Navy budget, while also seeking resources for the Navy's top-priority programs, including nuclear-powered surface ships and the Polaris project.

The Polaris undertaking became even more urgent on 3 August 1957, when the Soviet Union conducted the world's first long-range ICBM test. During this test, the R-7 missile flew several thousand kilometers from the launch site at Töretam to strike in Siberia. A few weeks later – on 4 October 1957 – the Soviet Union launched Sputnik, the first artificial Earth satellite, into orbit using the R-7. This prompted Secretary of the Navy Thomas S. Gates to propose, on 23 October of that year, an acceleration of the Polaris program by deploying shorter-range missiles (1,200 nautical miles – 2,225 km) by December 1959, along with three submarines to carry them by mid-1962 at the latest, and a missile with a range of 1,500 nautical miles by mid-1963. A month later, the program was accelerated again by shortening the deadline for preparing the 1,200-nautical-mile missile to October 1960. In December 1957, after meeting the initial schedule for preparing the submarines to carry Polaris missiles, the ballistic missile program's timeline was revised once more, accelerating the delivery of the second Polaris submarine to March 1960 and the third to December of that year.

=== Construction of the ships ===
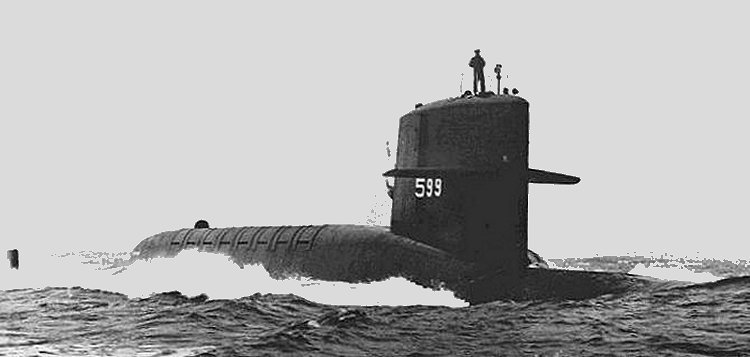
USS Patrick Henry (SSBN-599), George Washington class

In order to enable the rapid construction of underwater ballistic missile carriers, the United States Navy altered its plans regarding the nuclear-powered attack submarines (SSNs) that had already begun construction. For this reason, the first five units carrying Polaris missiles (SSBN 598–602) were derivatives of the Skipjack-class submarines.

These vessels had a streamlined hull with a single propeller and a nuclear propulsion system using the S5W reactor, delivering 15,000 horsepower. To accommodate ballistic missiles, this class of submarine was lengthened by 39.6 metres – 13.7 m for specialized navigation and missile control systems, 3 m for auxiliary equipment, and 22.9 m for two rows (eight in each) of launch tubes. The choice of 16 launch tubes per submarine was based on polling members of the Special Projects Office (SPO) team and averaging their recommendations. Much larger than the original Skipjack-type submarines, the SSBNs retained the same propulsion plant, which made them significantly slower than the Skipjack-class vessels.

The first SSBN, USS George Washington (SSBN-598), was created by combining components from the submarine Scorpion (SSN-589), whose keel was laid on 1 November 1958, with those of Skipjack. To build the George Washington, a new order was placed, this time for a vessel of a new type, initially designated SSGN(FBN)-588. Due to the development of the Soviet missile program and, more significantly, the political phenomenon known as the "missile gap", the production of SSBN submarines received the highest national priority.

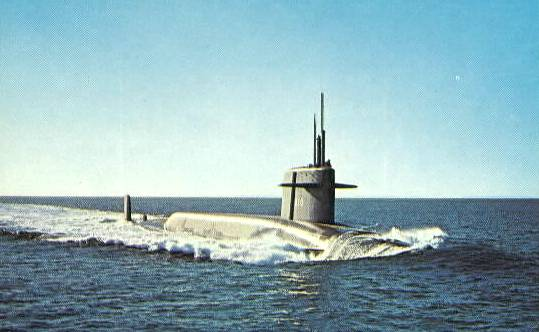
USS Thomas A. Edison (SSBN-610), Ethan Allen-class

The first five submarines were based on the Skipjack-class design, with a test depth of 215 metres, except for the first vessel, George Washington, whose missile compartment was not – unlike the hulls of the other units – built from HY-80 steel, but from less durable High-Tensile Steel, resulting in a test depth of 183 metres for this submarine. The five Ethan Allen-class units were larger submarines based on the hull and machinery of the Thresher/Permit-class, with a test depth of 400 metres and a submerged displacement of 7,800 tons. The Lafayette-class submarines were the last Polaris units; they surpassed the other vessels in dimensions and displacement (8,250 tons submerged), and featured an improved sound-silencing system. All three classes carried 16 Polaris missiles each.

Polaris missiles could be launched while the submarine was fully submerged, at a depth of about 60 feet (18.3 m), at a rate of roughly one missile per minute. The biggest issue for Polaris submarines was communication, especially the delay in delivering a launch order to a submerged vessel. This problem was partially mitigated by technological upgrades, the use of towed antennas and satellite communications, as well as airborne relay platforms. However, the submarines' one-way communication and the potential delay meant these vessels were not suitable first-strike nuclear weapons. Nevertheless, thanks to the relatively high survivability of ballistic missile submarines compared to other strategic systems, they were ideal as second-strike or retaliatory weapons, making them a reliable means of strategic deterrence.

The first Polaris submarine, George Washington, was commissioned on 20 December 1959, and on 18 June the following year, it set out on its first patrol, during which it conducted the first launch of an unarmed Polaris A-1 missile. On board at the time were Rear Admiral William F. Raborn – head of the Special Projects Office – both crews, and a number of technicians, making for a total of about 250 people. During the launch, minor issues arose with the countdown procedure, prompting the submarine to return to port without launching the remaining two scheduled missiles. After correcting the malfunctions, the vessel put out to sea again and completed the two remaining launches. After the second launch, Rear Admiral Raborn sent a direct message from the submarine to President Dwight D. Eisenhower: "POLARIS – FROM OUT OF THE DEEP TO TARGET. PERFECT". These submarines introduced a new operational standard in which each vessel had two full crews, in this case, 135 officers and sailors. These crews were known as the "Gold" and "Blue" crews. One crew would take the submarine on a 60-day patrol, after which the vessel would return to port for resupply and minor repairs, and then head out again on another 60-day patrol with the second crew, while the first would rest and train. In this way, two-thirds of all Polaris submarines were at sea at any given time.

The first operational combat patrol of USS George Washington began on 15 November 1960. During this patrol, it carried 16 Polaris A-1 missiles with a range of 1,200 nautical miles, armed with W47 nuclear warheads, each with a yield of 600 kilotons. SSBN-598 remained on patrol for 67 days, 66 of which were spent fully submerged. Before its return to base on 30 December 1960, the second Polaris submarine, Patrick Henry (SSBN-599), set out on patrol, marking the beginning of regular United States SSBN patrols.

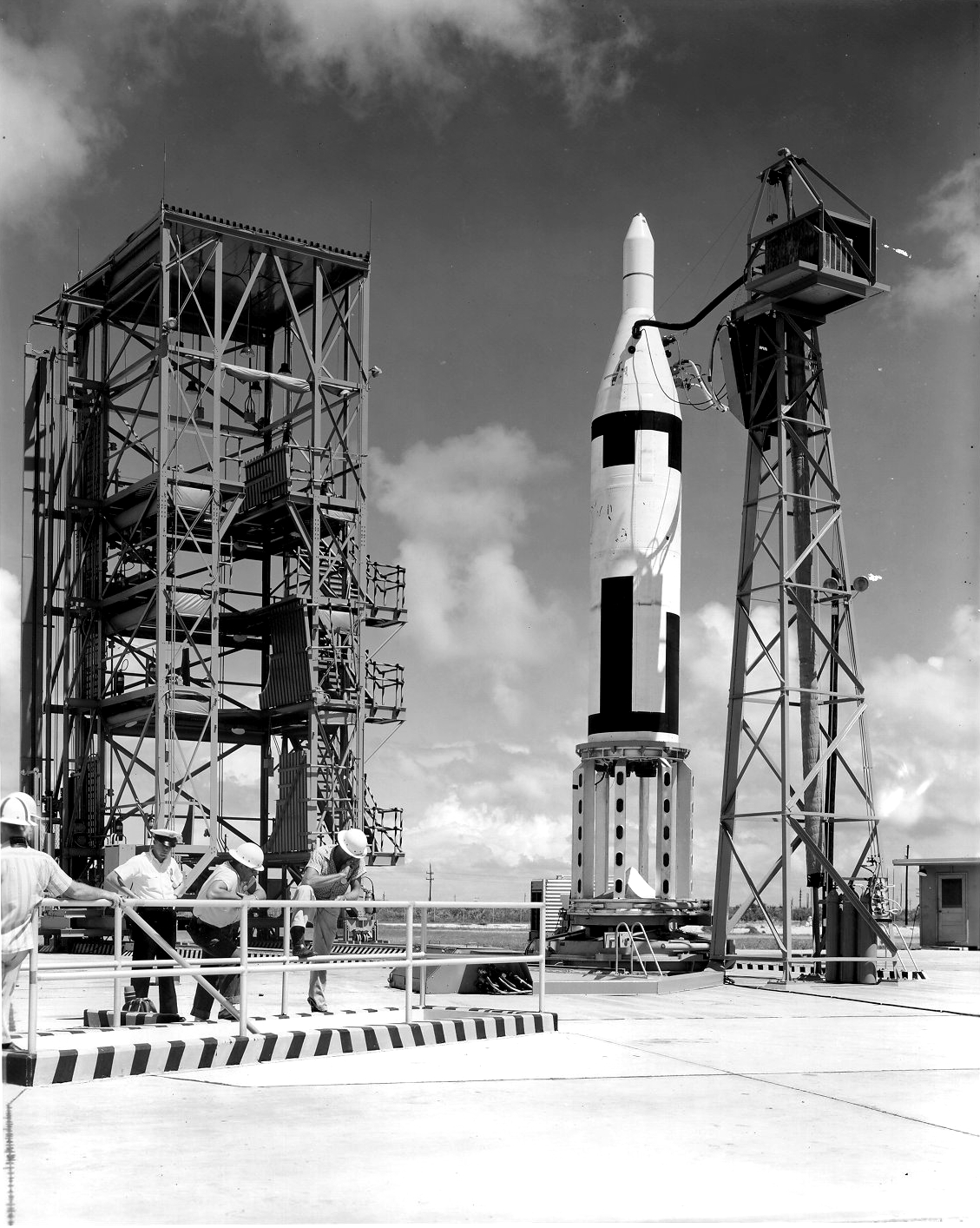
Polaris AX-1 at launch pad CC LC-25A, 24 September 1958

United States Navy planners prepared SSBN deployment sites in the Atlantic and Pacific where the submarines would be less vulnerable to Soviet anti-submarine warfare systems. However, President John F. Kennedy's administration decided to send three Polaris submarines to the Mediterranean Sea as replacements for the IRBM Jupiter missiles that were being withdrawn from Turkey following the resolution of the Cuban Missile Crisis. To reveal the presence of Polaris submarines in the region to the Soviet Union, the first SSBN to enter the Mediterranean – Sam Houston (SSBN-609) – arrived at the Turkish port of İzmir on 14 April 1963. The entry of Sam Houston into Izmir marked the first visit of a Polaris submarine to a foreign port outside Holy Loch Refit Site One in Holy Loch, Scotland, which had served as a forward base for these submarines since March 1961. The first American SSBN to begin a strategic deterrence patrol in the Pacific was Daniel Boone (SSBN-629), which departed the Guam base on 25 December 1964, carrying 16 Polaris A-3 missiles in its launch tubes.

Initially, the United States Navy proposed a final number of about 40 Polaris submarines. However, some Pentagon officials – including Secretary of Defense Donald Quarles – demanded as many of these units as possible, anticipating strong congressional support for building as many as one hundred of them. Admiral Arleigh Burke, however, stated that when developing the requirement for 39 to 42 submarines (each carrying 16 missiles), he based it on the current number of targets for nuclear strikes on Soviet territory, which was then doubled for redundancy and reliability. An additional 10 percent was added to account for losses due to Soviet anti-ballistic missile defenses, and another 20 percent was added to compensate for potential missile malfunctions. The total number of Polaris submarines was determined with the assumption that two-thirds of the fleet would be on patrol at any given time, operated using two crews per submarine. As a result, the United States Navy and the Department of Defense planned a fleet of 45 SSBNs, with at least 29 of them patrolling at any given time and capable of striking 232 Soviet targets. However, in September 1961, then-Secretary of Defense Robert McNamara recommended to President Kennedy a final total of 41 Polaris submarines, carrying 656 missiles. This led to the adoption of a plan for 41 submarines, known as the 41 for Freedom program. As a result, by 1967, the United States Navy had received 41 Polaris submarines organized into four squadrons, carrying a total of 656 SLBMs. Additionally, the British Royal Navy constructed four Polaris submarines equipped with American Polaris A-3 missiles armed with British nuclear warheads. Between 1960 and 1967, American shipyards produced nearly 9½ nuclear submarines per year – a rate never again achieved in the United States, though it was surpassed by Soviet shipyards in the 1970s.

The American Polaris submarines carried 16 SLBMs. Additionally, the American missiles could be launched from fully submerged submarines and had better accuracy. Along with missile development, the United States heavily invested in the advancement of fire control and navigation systems for submarines, which became critically important in the future due to the development of missiles with very long (intercontinental) range. Despite the technological primitiveness – by today's standards – of the Polaris submarines' satellite navigation system, the "Ships Inertial Navigation System" (SINS) was an extraordinary achievement at the time. It provided accurate navigation based on the submarine's movement using external navigational sources, with only periodic updates.

Another achievement was the development of life-support systems onboard the submarine for the duration of a patrol, including the ability to produce oxygen and drinking water while submerged. Overall, at the time they were built, alongside the Triton (SSRN-586), the Polaris submarines were the largest, most complex, and – considering their combat payload – the most powerful submarines ever constructed up to that point.

The missile launch preparation time was 15 minutes from the moment the launch order was received. The missiles could be launched at intervals of about one minute, and the submerged submarine could be moving at a maximum speed of 1 knot during the launch. The launch depth, measured from the submarine's keel, was approximately 125 feet (38.1 meters). During the Polaris program, the United States Navy also considered the possibility of launching Jupiter and Polaris missiles from surface ships and disguised commercial merchant vessels, including those with mixed international crews from NATO member states; however, this concept was never widely developed.

=== Development of Polaris missiles ===
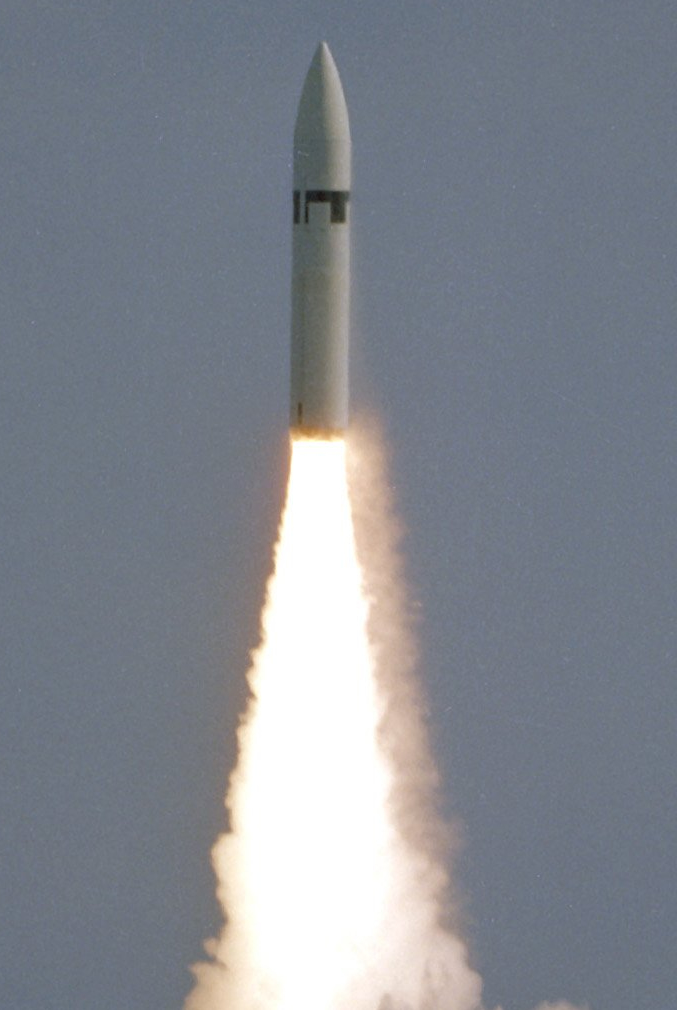
UGM-27C Polaris A-3

The UGM-27A Polaris A-1 missiles, with a range of 1,200 nautical miles, were conceived as a temporary weapon at the beginning of the solid-fuel missile program. A newer, longer-range version was already in development when USS George Washington embarked on its first patrol equipped with these missiles.

The UGM-27B Polaris A-2, with a range of 1,500 nautical miles, first went on patrol in June 1962 aboard USS Ethan Allen. A month earlier, on 6 May 1962, Ethan Allen, operating 2,000 km from the Hawaiian Islands, conducted the first and so far only full American ballistic missile system test – from launch to atmospheric nuclear detonation – as part of Operation Frigate Bird. The Polaris A-2 missile used in this test carried a W47 warhead with a yield of 1.2 megatons over a distance of 1,760 km, detonating 840 km northeast of Christmas Island. The next missile version – the UGM-27C Polaris A-3 – was first deployed in September 1964 aboard USS Daniel Webster (SSBN-626). All three Polaris variants had the same diameter of 1.37 meters, which allowed for missile replacement via standard loading procedures. Nevertheless, all 41 Polaris submarines were ultimately equipped with A-3 missiles.

While the A-1 and A-2 missiles carried a single W47 re-entry vehicle (RV) warhead, the A-3 missiles were equipped with three MRV (Multiple Re-entry Vehicle) warheads launched toward a single target. Each of the three W58 warheads had a yield of 200 kilotons, and the total weight of the MRV package was approximately 500 kg. The introduction of MRVs into the A-3 missile was intended to compensate for the limited accuracy of ballistic missiles at that stage of development.

The fourth deployed missile, in the C-3 variant, was named the UGM-73 Poseidon C-3. The Poseidon was a significantly larger missile, with a diameter of 1.88 meters, though it had the same range as the A-3 missiles – 2,500 nautical miles. However, it had a major advantage over the Polaris missiles: due to the expansion of the Soviet anti-ballistic missile defense system, it became the first missile in the world to be equipped with MIRVs(Multiple Independently Targetable Reentry Vehicles). This missile carried between 10 and 14 W68 MIRV warheads, each with a yield of 50 kilotons, all capable of being independently aimed at separate targets within a given area.

At the same time, the Navy proposed the Polaris B-3 as the successor to the A-3. This missile, with a diameter of 1.88 meters, could carry six warheads with a yield of 170 kilotons each, along with penetration aids, to the same range as the A-3. The first 16 Poseidon C-3 missiles went on patrol in March 1971 aboard USS James Madison (SSBN-627).

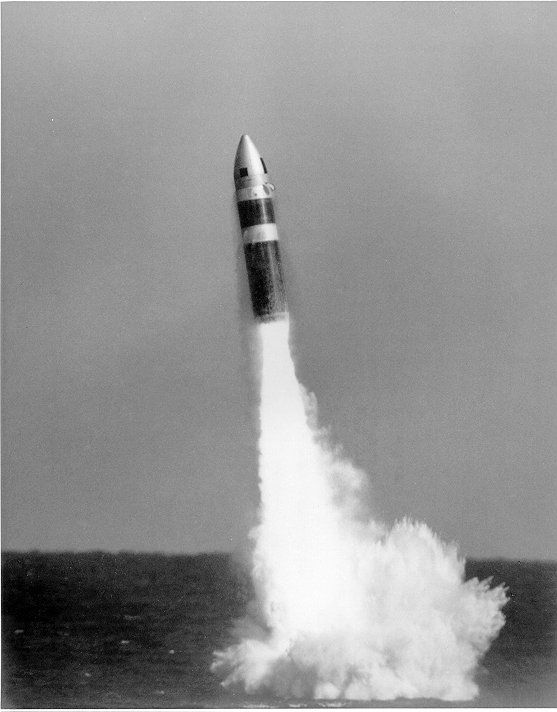
UGM-73 Poseidon C-3

The installation of new, larger missiles aboard Polaris submarines required appropriate modifications to these vessels; however, the scope of these changes turned out to be relatively minor, and all 31 Lafayette-class submarines were adapted to carry the missiles. The final version of the Polaris/Poseidon system was called EXPO (Extended-range Poseidon), and it entered an advanced stage of development in the early 1970s. The foundation of this process soon became the UGM-93A Trident I C-4 missiles, carried by 12 Lafayette-class submarines modified to accommodate them. The C-4 missiles, with a diameter of 1.88 meters, had a theoretical range of 4,000 nautical miles (7,400 km) and carried six MIRV W76 warheads, each with a yield of 100 kilotons.

The last Polaris submarine patrol ended in 1994, marking the end of an important era in the history of ballistic missile submarines. As these submarines were retired, efforts were made to adapt them for other tasks – particularly as attack submarines (SSN) – but these attempts failed due to weak armament, limited sonar capabilities, low speed, and high noise levels. Ultimately, the last submarine of the 41 for Freedom program – USS Kamehameha – was fully retired in 2002, having completed its service as a transport vessel.

== Second-generation systems ==
All American submarines used nuclear propulsion; American Polaris missiles had greater range, were more accurate, and were adapted for underwater launch. Introduced in 1971, the Poseidon was the world's first missile deployed with independently targetable MIRV warheads.

== SALT I Treaty ==
Signed in 1972, the SALT I Treaty limited the number of nuclear weapons delivery platforms, including the number of operational units and those under construction as of 26 May 1972. Under this agreement, the United States, which was at the time launching its Trident program, agreed to a limit of 44 ballistic missile submarines carrying a total of 710 SLBMs. The Soviet Union, in turn, accepted a limit of 62 submarines (the number then in service and under construction) equipped with a total of 950 SLBMs. The introduction of new launchers (i.e., on new submarines) required – according to the agreement – the dismantling of an equivalent number of land-based ICBM launchers or other sea-based SLBM launchers, no later than the start date of sea trials of the new submarine. This treaty represented the most significant legal framework limiting the number of warships since the London Naval Treaty of the 1930s. Since SALT I applied only to the United States and the Soviet Union, the latter argued that it did not bind the United Kingdom, France, or China – the other potential adversaries of the Soviet Union, who were also building SSBNs.

== Third-generation systems ==
The development of Soviet offensive and defensive potentials – especially the anti-ballistic missile (ABM) system and anti-submarine warfare forces – shook American chances of surviving a first nuclear strike and conducting an effective response. Additionally, there was a noticeable lack of coordination among various branches of the U.S. armed forces in the development of strategic weapons. To address these problems, in 1966, Secretary of Defense Robert McNamara ordered the conduct of studies under the codename Strat-X, tasked with identifying possible alternatives to counter the Soviet ABM system. The Strat-X studies involved officers from the U.S. Navy and the USAF as well as civilian scientists and engineers. These efforts focused on considering about 125 alternative missile projects, of which only two were based on naval systems. In this latter area, consideration was given both to carrying ballistic missiles on surface ships and on a new type of submarine – referred to in these studies as a suboption. This alternative was based on new Poseidon missiles carried by 31 existing Polaris submarines and 20 to 25 submarines of the new type. In the final Strat-X conclusions, the creation of four new missile systems was proposed:

- a new ICBM system in hardened missile launch facilities;
- a new mobile ICBM system;
- a ship-based long-range missile system (SLMS);
- an undersea long-range missile system (ULMS).

=== ULMS/Trident ===
Contrary to the Strat-X secretary of defense's demand to propose the best strategic system, Strat-X presented a set of land-based and sea-based options. Ultimately, the only feasible solution at that time proved to be the ULMS system. Within Strat-X, a missile 15.2 meters long and 2 meters in diameter was considered – significantly larger than the Poseidon missile. The concept of using such a large missile led to an initial vision of an ULMS submarine with a surfaced displacement of 8,240 tons and a length of 135 meters. 24 missiles were nominally to be carried horizontally (not vertically) outside the pressure hull in protective canisters. According to these assumptions, the missiles could be released from the submarine at any achievable speed and diving depth. The missile launch itself was to be delayed to avoid revealing the submarine's position through the tracked backward trajectory of the missile – which was expected to greatly increase the submarine's chances of survival. The ULMS submarine was to have nuclear propulsion, with a relatively low speed – not exceeding 25 knots. The speed limitation was based on the assumption that higher speed increases the submarine's noise level, thus increasing the risk of detection – in a situation where a large ballistic missile submarine (SSBN) obviously would not outrun a Soviet hunter-killer submarine (SSN) anyway.

In July 1968, the Special Projects Office (SPO), which had overseen the Polaris and Poseidon programs, was renamed the Strategic Systems Project Office (SSPO), and Rear Admiral Levering Smith was appointed as its head. Like his predecessor, Admiral Raborn – the father of the Polaris system – Smith had no background in submarines. He also made the decision to abandon the innovative horizontal missile stowage system. Over time, however, the SSPO gradually lost influence over the ULMS program. As a result of lobbying by Admiral Rickover, the U.S. Navy's Office of the Chief of Naval Operations established a separate ULMS project office, headed by Rear Admiral Harvey E. Lyon – a submarine officer – while control over the new submarine's missile system program remained with the SSPO under Rear Admiral Smith.

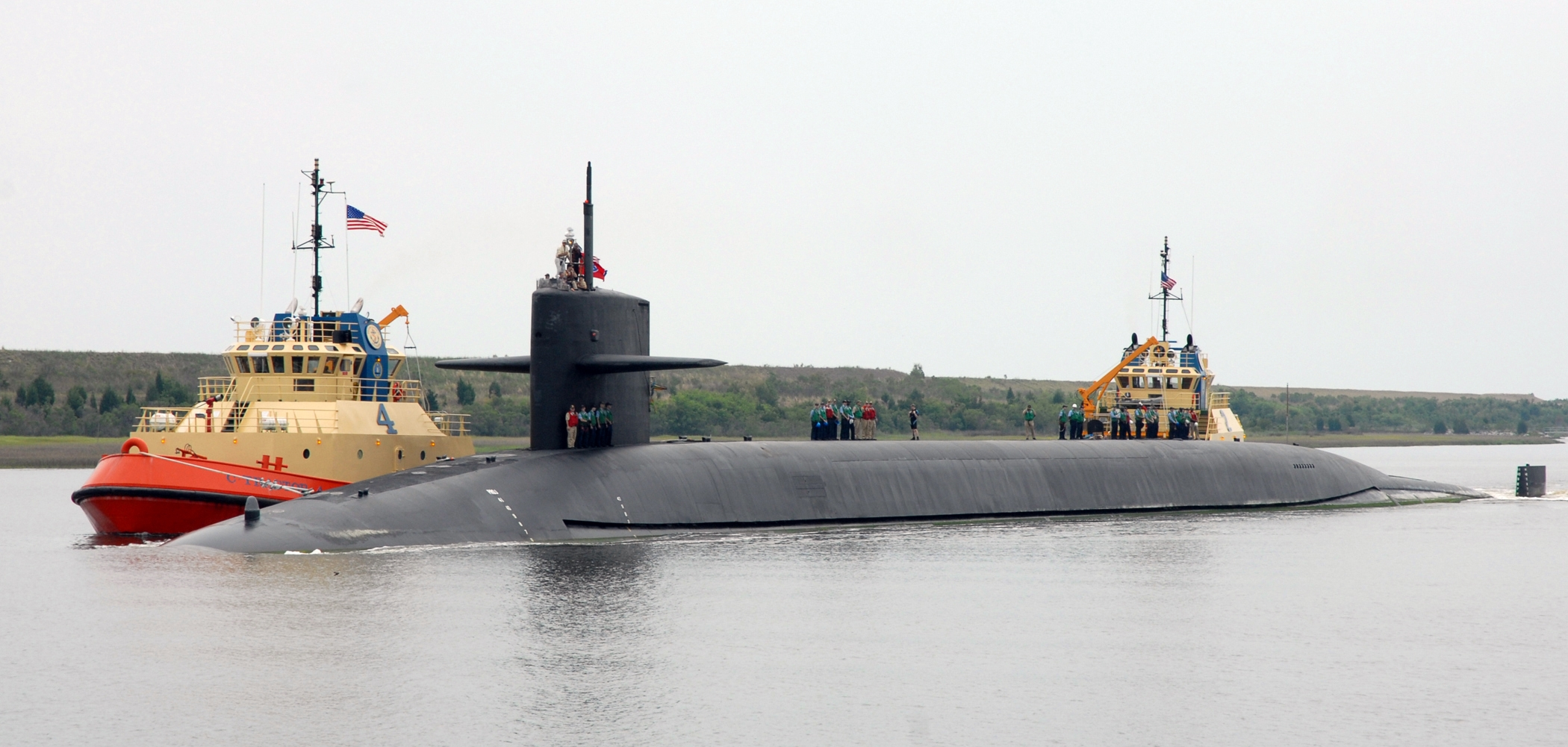
Ohio-class ship

Soon afterward, the General Dynamics-owned shipyard Electric Boat received a contract to develop a design for the new submarine. Admiral Rickover, who had significant influence over the submarine program, pushed to replace the proposed 17,000 hp S5G reactor for the new class with a more powerful 60,000 hp unit and advocated for a larger submarine capable of carrying 24 ballistic missiles. Ultimately, it was decided to construct the submarine with the S8G reactor, generating 35,000 hp and powering a single propeller via two steam turbines. This arrangement created the most powerful single-reactor propulsion system ever designed for a U.S. submarine. The final design envisioned submarines with a surface displacement of 16,700 tons and a submerged displacement of 18,700 tons, a length of 170.7 meters, and 24 vertical SLBM launch tubes, with an officially stated top speed of about 25 knots. Special emphasis was placed on quieting the submarine, particularly its propulsion system. Reports suggest that the final result exceeded noise reduction requirements at low speeds, when the propulsion used natural circulation (convection) instead of forced circulation in the primary loop.

Admiral Rickover and Chief of Naval Operations Admiral Elmo Zumwalt lobbied Congress for the ULMS program's approval, which on 16 May 1972 received the name Trident. The program faced significant controversy – some members of Congress and anti-nuclear organizations campaigned against it. Both sides used the SALT treaty to support their arguments. The situation was further complicated when Jimmy Carter became President of the United States. Carter initially sought to limit the number of SLBMs to 200. In January 1980, his Secretary of Defense, Harold Brown, announced a plan to build a new, lower-cost class of strategic missile submarines as an alternative to the Trident type. The Carter administration allocated 106 million dollars (in then-current value) for research and development of this smaller, budget-friendly missile submarine. For many observers, this signaled a sidelining of the Trident program. However, the situation changed with Ronald Reagan's electoral victory. As part of Reagan's strategic 600-ship Navy plan, the Trident program was given high priority, with the aim of building one submarine per year.

The missile program for the Trident submarines, however, encountered technical and organizational difficulties. This led SSPO to propose a temporary alternative: the EXPO (Extended Range Poseidon) missile. Presented as a system that could be fielded by 1972 – many years ahead of the intended Trident missile – it offered shorter range but faster availability. EXPO was an evolution of the existing Polaris–Poseidon missiles, with a range of 4,000 nautical miles (7,410 km) and the capability to carry up to eight 100-kiloton MIRV warheads. Eventually designated Trident I C-4, the missile could be deployed on existing Polaris–Poseidon submarines as well as on the new Trident subs, serving as an interim weapon until the long-range missile was ready. Initial contracts for the design, development, and production of the C-4 and the eventual D-5 missiles were awarded to Lockheed Corporation, which had experience from its work on Polaris and Poseidon.

In reality, the first two stages of the EXPO/Trident C-4 were the same as those of the Poseidon missile. As an alternative to the MIRV warheads (W76/Mk-4) of the C-4, the MaRV (maneuverable reentry vehicle) warhead Mk 500 Evader was under development for penetrating ABM systems. Although several tests of this warhead were successfully conducted, the program was never completed.

After an intense debate in 1974, funding was allocated for the first Trident-class submarine. Initial plans envisioned a construction schedule of 1-3-3-3 new submarines between 1977 and 1982. However, once construction of the first unit began, the entire building program was accelerated, with a new completion date set for 30 April 1979. Just like the Polaris submarines two decades earlier, the Trident submarines were granted the highest priority – Brickbat.

The first units of the program faced delays due to management difficulties, design changes, and issues stemming from the simultaneous construction of the new generation Los Angeles-class (688) attack submarines at the Electric Boat shipyard. Additionally, the second American shipyard capable of building nuclear-powered submarines, Newport News, was also participating in the construction of the 688-class SSNs and was already operating at full production capacity. Since 1972, only these two shipyards in the United States have been formally and practically capable of producing nuclear submarines. Personal controversies surrounding Admiral Rickover also contributed to the Trident program's challenges, stemming both from his personality traits and several substantive decisions he made.

The prototype submarine of the Trident class – Ohio (SSBN-726) – was launched at Electric Boat on 7 April 1979. At the time, it was the largest submarine ever built in the world. SSBN-726 was commissioned into the U.S. Navy on 11 November 1981, marking the beginning of a new family of submarines known as the Ohio class (the terms "Ohio class" and "Trident class" are equivalent and used interchangeably). Ohio set out on its first patrol on 1 October 1982, carrying 24 Trident I C-4 missiles, which had already completed their first patrol back in October 1979 aboard the Polaris submarine USS Francis Scott Key. To demonstrate the flexibility of the Polaris submarines, 11 other older vessels were also rearmed with the new missiles.

Construction of the Ohio-class submarines was halted following the end of the Cold War. The construction of the final – 18th – Trident submarine was authorized by the U.S. president in 1990. When its construction was completed in 1997, all 41 Polaris–Poseidon–Trident C-4 submarines had been decommissioned, with the exception of two vessels that had been converted for special operations.

=== Trident II D-5 ===
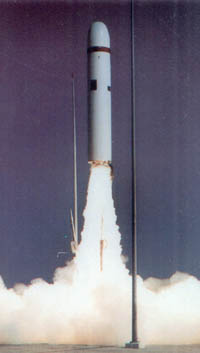
Trident D-5

The UGM-133A Trident II D-5 missiles represent the pinnacle of United States achievements in submarine-launched ballistic missile (SLBM) design to date and, aside from the now-retired LGM-118A Peacekeeper, in ballistic missile design overall, considering the missile's range and – above all – its accuracy. The guidance system of the missile is capable of placing eight thermonuclear MIRV warheads within a circle 170.7 meters in diameter at a distance of 4,000 nautical miles (7,400 km). The D-5 missile nominally carries eight MIRV warheads with yields ranging from 100 to 475 kilotons. In total, around 400 W88/Mk5 MIRV warheads were produced for the Trident II, each with a yield of 475 kilotons. The remaining missiles of this type are armed with W76/Mk-4 MIRV warheads. In the latter case, the D-5 can carry up to 14 warheads.

After the missile's development process – marked by numerous test failures – was completed, the D-5 entered operational service in March 1990 aboard the ninth Trident submarine to be built, USS Tennessee (SSBN-734). Of the 18 Trident submarines, the first 8 were equipped with Trident C-4 missiles, and the following 10 with Trident D-5 missiles. Originally, all Ohio-class submarines were to be outfitted with the D-5 system, but these plans were altered as a result of arms reduction treaties with the Soviet Union. Eight submarines of the Pacific Fleet remained equipped solely with Trident I C-4 missiles. The Navy's decision to equip these eight Pacific Fleet submarines with Trident D-5 missiles was not made until 1996. As of 2008, a total of 122 underwater test launches of this missile had been conducted; since 22 March 1989 – when a missile exploded four seconds after launch – there have been no failed tests.

The missile is capable of striking any target on Earth within 30 minutes and can carry out what NATO terms a "prompt attack", in which the time from launch to target destruction is no more than 10–15 minutes. Combined with an exceptionally low circular error probable (CEP) of 90 meters, Trident II is considered an excellent weapon for an effective first strike. The missile owes its high accuracy to its guidance technology, which includes a two-dimensional triangulation system that takes angular measurements of two stars to update the inertial navigation system. The missile is significantly larger than the D-4, and its warheads are arranged in the post-bus section around the third-stage propulsion engine. A particularly notable feature at the time of the missile's introduction into service was its "instant targeting" capability – allowing the target coordinates to be changed at any time during a patrol. Earlier American missiles lacked this feature; even the most advanced of them at the time, the Trident C-4, only allowed selection from a limited number of pre-programmed targets set before the patrol began.

== Fourth-generation submarines ==
At the end of the Cold War, the United States developed and introduced into service a type of submarine representing the pinnacle of American underwater military engineering and technology – the Seawolf-class hunter-killer submarines, also known as SSN21. They were designed for extended patrols in Soviet territorial waters – especially in the Barents and Okhotsk seas. Their design enabled combating Soviet SLBM-carrying submarines. The noise reduction technologies applied on Seawolf submarines lowered the noise levels generated by these units to a level ahead of their time. The quietness of SSN21 submarines remains a benchmark to this day in the construction of nuclear-powered submarines, regardless of the country developing the design. Due to the end of the Cold War, the U.S. halted the construction program of Seawolf-class units, focusing instead on building versatile, multi-mission Virginia-class NSSN (New Attack Submarine) vessels, but did not pursue a new SSBN construction program.

== American system ==
The United States demonstrated great innovation in the design of submarines and the missile systems it carried. The truth of this statement is best demonstrated by the large number of submarine designs, missiles, as well as propulsion systems, and the pace at which advanced technological solutions were introduced.

However, after the loss of the Thresher (SSN-593) in 1963, the United States Navy became very conservative in the design and construction of submarines, and to some extent also in operational terms. This conservative approach to submarine design was visible, for example, in the prolonged use of HY-80 steel. HY-80 steel – first used on Skipjack-class submarines in 1959 – was used through the Polaris submarines and up to the Los Angeles-class SSNs. This resulted not only in a failure to increase operational depth but even a decrease in operational depth for 62 Los Angeles-class units. The U.S. Navy's persistence in using this steel instead of the stronger HY-100 was dictated by difficulties in processing the latter, as well as weight considerations of the vessels. This affected not only the allowable operational depth of the vessels but also hull strength, reducing the number of sections exposed to pressure, decreasing hydrostatic reserve buoyancy, and limiting the margin for future modernization. At the same time, the operational depth of Soviet submarines significantly increased. The first submarine to use the stronger HY-100 steel in its construction was the prototype Seawolf (SSN-21), and this change allowed submarines of this class to return to an operational depth of 400 meters.

The conservatism of the U.S. Navy, triggered by the Thresher disaster, was also evident in Admiral Rickover's abandonment of the cutting-edge, revolutionary hunter-killer submarine design developed under the CONFORM program. On the other hand, U.S. Navy caution led to the construction of reactors that were significantly safer than the Soviet ones, stricter safety procedures, and better crew training.

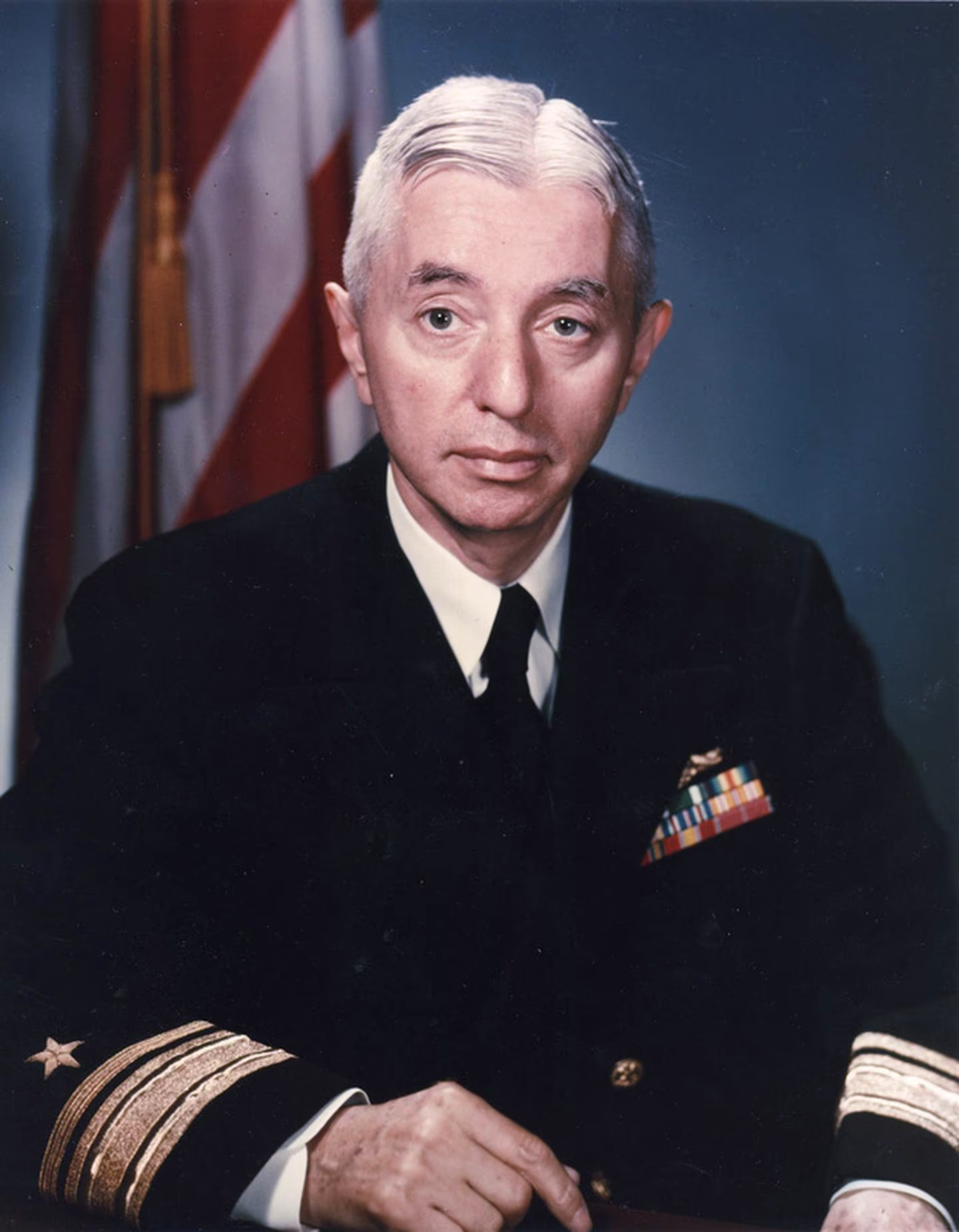
Hyman Rickover

Throughout the Cold War, the primary factor in the technological rivalry between the U.S. and Soviet navies was the degree of submarine silencing. Unlike parameters such as speed and permissible diving depth – where U.S. Navy submarines generally lagged behind their Soviet counterparts – the American navy managed to maintain technological superiority for decades in the field of noise reduction. Submarines of each American generation – both attack (SSN) and ballistic missile (SSBN) types – were significantly quieter than their Soviet equivalents. This advantage often exceeded the gap of a single generation and, in principle, persists to this day. Both sides engaged in a kind of intelligence race, the main goal of which – for the Americans – was to assess Soviet technological progress, and for the Soviets, to obtain the technology itself.

At the beginning of the Cold War, the design of submarines was handled directly by shipyards such as Electric Boat, Mare Island Naval Shipyard, and Portsmouth Naval Shipyard. In the nuclear era, however, the design teams at these American shipyards lost their independence in favor of the Bureau of Ships and its successor organizations. In the 1960s, Admiral Hyman Rickover effectively took control of this centralized system. U.S. Navy funding programs were under strict oversight by multiple congressional committees, the Congressional Budget Office, the Congressional Research Service, and the General Accounting Office, all of which continuously monitored and audited how funds were spent.

=== Industry ===
During the Cold War, the U.S. defense industry benefited from relatively high component quality and ready access to an industrial base of advanced technologies (for example, electronics, instrumentation and – later – computers). The United States' comparatively open society also enabled the swift exchange of experience that accelerated technological progress, while the economy's reliance on private industry allowed quicker responses to the Navy's changing needs. Two shipyards built ballistic-missile submarines: the versatile Newport News yard and Electric Boat, which specialized in nuclear-powered submarines. Beginning in the early 1960s, the United States consistently kept more than half of its SSBN fleet on patrol at any given time.

=== Human resources ===
For the first 15 years of the Cold War, American submarines were operated by a relatively narrow elite – a completely voluntary group. As a result, the large-scale Polaris submarine program led to a crew staffing problem. The U.S. Navy had to provide 82 highly trained crews within six years, each consisting of 136 people, plus crews for 20 new attack submarines – about 100 personnel for each unit. This became a bottleneck in the program and prompted a very difficult recruitment process, during which older officers and sailors were sometimes accepted for service on the new submarines in the 1960s. The U.S. Navy did not fully recover from all the personnel errors made by those officers recruited out of necessity, nor from the staffing policies of that era, until the mass personnel reductions that followed the end of the Cold War.

The U.S. Navy did not seek to resolve its personnel challenges by significantly increasing the level of automation aboard its submarines. The latest classes of American submarines have reduced crew sizes by only about five percent compared to those of 25 years prior. In practice, this situation is satisfactory for the U.S. Navy – something not changed even by the most modern attack submarines of the Seawolf and Virginia classes.

== Bibliography ==
- Polmar, Norman (2003). Cold War Submarines, The Design and Construction of U.S. and Soviet Submarines. Potomac Books. ISBN 1-57488-530-8.
