= B90 nuclear bomb =

B90 Nuclear Depth Strike Bomb (NDSB)
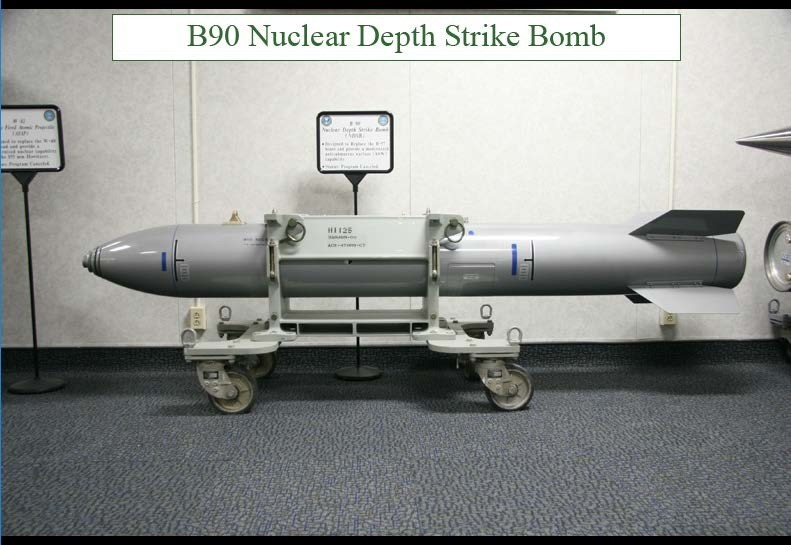
- B90 Nuclear Depth Strike Bomb (NDSB).
- Type: Nuclear weapon

Service history
- In service: Cancelled September 1991
- Used by: United States.

Specifications
- Mass: 780 pounds (350 kg)
- Length: 118 inches (3.0 m)
- Width: 13.3 inches (0.34 m)
- Detonation mechanism: Contact, airburst, depth
- Blast yield: low kt to 200 kilotons of TNT (840 TJ)

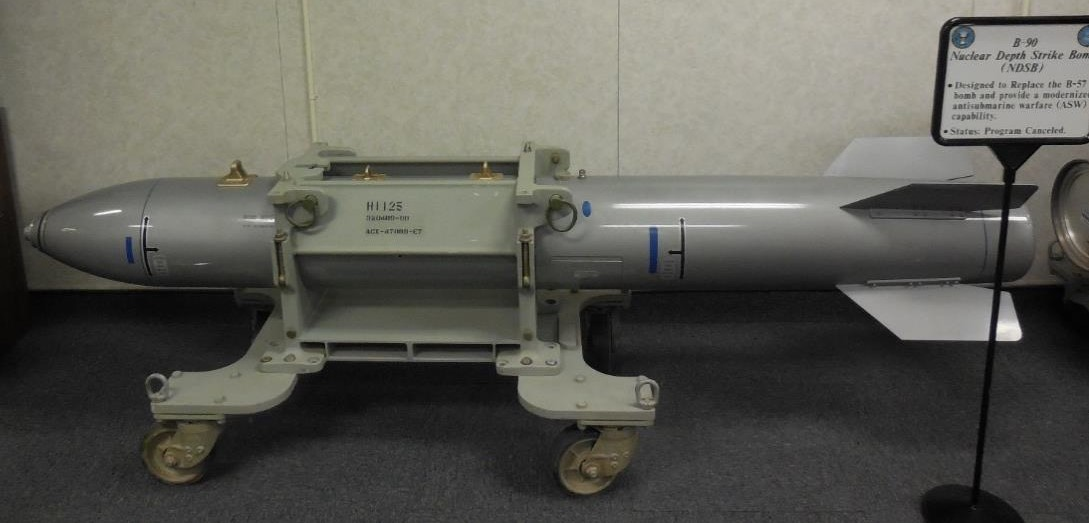
B90 Depth Strike Bomb.

The B90 Nuclear Depth Strike Bomb (NDSB) was an American thermonuclear bomb designed at Los Alamos National Laboratory in the mid-to-late 1980s and cancelled prior to introduction into military service due to the end of the Cold War.

The B90 design was intended for use as a naval aircraft weapon, for use as a nuclear depth bomb and as a land attack strike bomb. It was intended to replace the B57 nuclear bomb used by the Navy. The B90 bomb design entered Phase 3 development engineering and was assigned its numerical designation in June 1988.

The B90 was 13.3 inches (34 cm) in diameter and 118 inches (3.0 m) long, and weighed 780 pounds (350 kg). The B90's yield has been described at both 200 kilotons of TNT (840 TJ) and "low kt". This may indicate a variable yield weapon.

The B90 was cancelled in September 1991 along with the W89 and W91 nuclear warheads and AGM-131 SRAM II and SRAM-T missile models. No B90 production models were built, though test units may have been; US nuclear weapon testing continued until 1992.

== See also ==
- List of nuclear weapons
