= Astraea (nuclear warhead) =

British thermonuclear warhead

Astraea A21
- Type: Nuclear weapon
- Place of origin: United Kingdom

Service history
- In service: Planned from 2030s
- Used by: Royal Navy

Production history
- Designer: Atomic Weapons Establishment

Specifications
- Detonation mechanism: Contact, airburst

The Astraea A21 is a British nuclear warhead being developed by the Atomic Weapons Establishment to replace the Holbrook warheads on Royal Navy submarines from the 2030s.

Named after the Greek goddess of justice and precision, the warhead will be carried by the upcoming Dreadnought-class submarines on Trident II D5 missiles. The warhead is being developed in parallel with the American W93 nuclear warhead, with which it will share the Mark 7 re-entry body and some non-nuclear components.

== Background ==
Development of a replacement nuclear warhead for the Trident nuclear programme was confirmed on 25 February 2020, by the defence secretary, Ben Wallace. The warhead will be designed, developed, and manufactured in the UK by the Atomic Weapons Establishment (AWE), nationalised in 2021. The UK is participating in the W93 programme as observers, and supporting the UK is one of the specified aims of the project.

Collaboration with the United States takes place under the 1958 US–UK Mutual Defence Agreement and the Polaris Sales Agreement. Since 2016, the US and UK have collaborated on a "Joint Technology Demonstrator" to develop tests for warhead safety and manufacturing technologies.

The UK's stockpile of warheads was planned to decrease from a maximum of 225 to 180 by the mid-2020s, but was instead increased to 260 in the 2021 Integrated Review. The UK also stopped providing information on the numbers of operational and deployed warheads or missiles, under its policy of deliberate ambiguity.

The "Replacement Warhead" programme's acquisition cycle is reported to consist of 6 phases covering both production and disposal of military equipment. The British government spent £214 million on the project until the end of financial year 2020–21. It was confirmed to have entered the "concept" phase in March 2023, setting out requirements and the options available.

== Research ==
Development will involve the use of AWE's Orion laser, which uses 10 long-pulse beams and 2 petawatt short-pulse beams, to simulate conditions at detonation up to 10 million °C. Computer modelling will involve AWE's Valiant supercomputer. Hydrodynamic and radiographic studies will use a joint French-UK EPURE facility at Valduc in France, under Project Teutates, established under the Lancaster House treaties.

AWE planned a 'Mensa' nuclear warhead assembly and disassembly facility in Burghfield, as well as 'Pegasus' enriched uranium and 'Aurora' plutonium manufacturing facilities at Aldermaston. In August 2024, the Aurora project was in the early design phase and was forecasted to cost £2.3 billion and Pegasus was to cost £1.7 billion (from an original cost of £634 million). In March 2023, Mensa was to cost £2.16 billion. The projects had been subject to delays and cost overruns, with Mensa running 7 years late, and £1.2 billion over-budget, while Pegasus was paused in 2018. Pegasus was restarted in 2021 and completion of the storage facility was to be by 2025 and the manufacturing facility by 2030. Mensa was expected to be completed by 2024. These projects were developed under the Nuclear Warhead Capability Sustainment Programme (NWCSP), launched in 2005 to maintain the UK's nuclear warhead infrastructure and support the development of any replacement warhead.

AWE later merged the Aurora, Pegasus and other smaller projects into a single Future Materials Campus (FMC), also based at Aldermaston, planned for procurement in 2025. It is thought to also be aimed at addressing the skills shortages in the nuclear sector.

Under the UK's obligations under the Comprehensive Nuclear-Test-Ban Treaty, it will be the first British warhead deployed without live tests.

== Programme status ==
It was confirmed to be named Astraea, after the ancient Greek goddess of justice, and designated as the A21/Mk7 in a Defence Nuclear Enterprise command paper in March 2024.

In the 2025 Strategic Defence Review, the Ministry of Defence announced plans to invest £15 billion in the UK's warhead programme over the following four years. The investment includes maintaining the existing Holbrook warheads and modernising associated infrastructure, and is expected to support around 9,000 jobs. The current warhead stockpile is to be maintained while the Astraea warhead is developed.

The new warhead is planned to enter service in the 2030s, when the Holbrook warheads reach the end of their service life. As of October 2025, Around £1 billion was forecast to be spent on research and development for the Astraea project over the next decade. The total projected cost of the Astraea programme was withheld on "national security" grounds.

== Design ==
The Mark 7 aeroshell and some other non-nuclear components will be shared with the United States under existing treaty arrangements, and the warhead is considered unlikely to differ substantially from the W93 design. Collaboration with the US is intended to ensure compatibility with the Trident missile system. The Mark 7 aeroshell imposes specific limits on the warhead's size, mass and weight distribution.

It is reported as likely to mirror the American W93's yield, between that of the W76-1 (90 kt) and the W88 (475 kt). This could represent a significant increase in yield over the current 100 kt Holbrook warhead. The development of a low yield variant warhead has reportedly been explored, but not officially confirmed. Technologies being developed through the Joint Technology Demonstrator, as well as insensitive high explosives, are expected to be incorporated into the warhead.

It is likely to be designed to resist radiation and electromagnetic interference, possibly including cold X-rays. Countermeasures against missile defence systems are likely to be incorporated into the aeroshell.

== See also ==
- Defence Nuclear Enterprise
- Dreadnought-class submarine
- Trident (UK nuclear programme)
- Tête nucléaire océanique
- United Kingdom and weapons of mass destruction
- W93 - planned American warhead
