= W91 (disambiguation) =

The W91 was an American thermonuclear warhead project.

W91 may also refer to:

- Small dodecahemidodecahedron
- Smith Mountain Lake Airport, in Bedford County, Virginia, United States
