= LX-14 =

Polymer-bonded explosive

LX-14 and LX-14-0 are polymer-bonded explosives developed by Lawrence Livermore National Laboratory and used in nuclear weapons in the United States.

== Ingredients ==
LX-14 is made of HMX explosive powder (95.5%) and Estane and 5702-Fl plastic binders (4.5%).

== Properties ==
LX-14-0 has a density of 1830 kg/m^{3}, detonation velocity of 8,830 m/s and detonation pressure of 37 GPa.
