= Strategic Defence Review (2025) =

UK government defence review

The Strategic Defence Review is a review of the United Kingdom's defence policy, published on 2 June 2025. It is the first such review carried out by a Labour government since 2003. The review was led by former NATO Secretary General Lord Robertson, with oversight from Defence Secretary John Healey. It was announced on 16 July 2024 by the newly incumbent Prime Minister Keir Starmer.

== Background ==
The previous defence review was part of the Integrated Review commissioned by Boris Johnson's Conservative government in 2021. It was revised a year later by his successors, Prime Ministers Liz Truss and Rishi Sunak, in response to the Russian invasion of Ukraine. Since then, Russia has continued its war in Ukraine, Iranian-backed Houthi rebels have launched attacks in the Red Sea and against Israel resulting in UK military intervention, China has continued to seek territorial expansion, and North Korea has provided substantial support to Russia's war effort. The armed forces have also experienced high-profile issues with recruitment and experts have argued that defence cuts have left it unequipped to be a "tier one" fighting force.

In January 2025, Donald Trump became President of the United States, having campaigned on a promise to make Europe more responsible for its own defence. In February, the United States entered peace talks with Russia, whilst excluding Ukrainian and European leaders. In response, an emergency summit for European leaders was held in Paris and concluded with an agreement that Europe must do more to defend itself and Ukraine, including through increased defence spending. On 25 February 2025, Starmer announced that the UK would be increasing its defence spending to 2.5% of GDP by 2027, raising to 3% by the next parliament, "if economic and fiscal conditions allow".

== Overview ==
In its election manifesto, the Labour Party pledged to conduct a defence review within the first year of government and this commenced on 16 July 2024, two weeks after its election victory. The review is to be headed by three external reviewers: Former NATO Secretary General and Defence Secretary Lord Robertson, United States Presidential advisor and foreign policy expert Dr Fiona Hill, and former Deputy Chief of the Defence Staff General Sir Richard Barrons. They will be supported by a review team comprising experts from inside and outside of government, including those in the armed forces, veterans, the defence industry, the general public, academia, parliament and close allies.

The review was expected to focus on several key areas, including homeland security, support for Ukraine, modernisation of the armed forces, the nuclear deterrent and the UK's continued leadership in NATO. Lead reviewer, Lord Robertson, stated in a press briefing that the UK and its allies were facing a "deadly quartet" of Russia, China, Iran and North Korea and said that the UK must be prepared to take on all four if necessary. This view was in contrast to the previous defence review which described China as a "systemic challenge" rather than a threat.

The government accepted all 62 recommendations in the review. On 1 June 2025, the following was announced prior to the full publication of the review:

- At least 6 new munition and energetics factories, with a £1.5 billion investment pipeline.
- Munitions factories to be in an "always on" capacity.
- Up to 7,000 long-range missiles
- Up to 12 SSN-AUKUS class submarines, starting in the latter 2030s
- £15 billion investment into the Astraea nuclear warhead programme for the upcoming Dreadnought-class submarines

Other changes later confirmed in the review include:

- ‘New Hybrid Navy’ goal - Dreadnought-class submarines, SSN-AUKUS submarines, warships and support ships, modifications to aircraft carriers, and autonomous vessels.
- Aim to increase the number of regular troops in the British Army to at least 76,000 by the next parliamentary session
- "10x more lethal" Army, involving "air defence, communications, AI, software, long-range weapons, and land drone swarms"
- £1 billion funding for homeland air and missile defence.
- Establishment of a CyberEM Command.
- £6 billion for munitions in the current parliament.
- Investments in Barrow and Raynesway sites to produce a SSN-AUKUS submarine every 18 months.
- Digital Targeting Web, with a £1 billion investment, delivered by 2027, enabling rapid, integrated battlefield decisions.
- UK Defence Innovation fund with £400m for UK businesses.
- Establishment of a Defence Exports Office to drive exports.
- £1.5 billion in new investment for military accommodation.
- Expansion of cadet forces by 30% by 2030 (with an ambition to reach 250,000).
- Defence Readiness Bill for mobilisation of reserves and industry in case of conflict.

The review commits to a “NATO First” approach as its defence framework, aiming for increased war-fighting readiness. The defence budget is to rise to 2.5% of GDP by 2027, with a target of 3% in the next parliamentary term.

In 2025, the Prime Minister announced the intention to recognise UK intelligence community spending as part of defence spending, so contributing to the spending of 2.6% of GDP on defence by 2027.

== See also ==
- 2026 Defence Investment Plan
- Premiership of Keir Starmer § Defence
