= W93 =

United States thermonuclear warhead

- Type: Nuclear weapon

Service history
- In service: Planned from 2034
- Used by: United States Navy

Production history
- Designer: Los Alamos National Laboratory
- Designed: Planned from 2023

Specifications
- Detonation mechanism: Contact, airburst

The W93 is an American nuclear warhead planned to replace the W76 and W88 warheads on United States Navy submarines from 2034. The warhead will be carried on the new Columbia-class submarines and will use a new aeroshell, the Mark 7 reentry body (RB). The warhead will be designed by Los Alamos National Laboratory.

The Mark 7 RB will also be used to house the United Kingdom's new warhead, Astraea, which will be carried on the upcoming Dreadnought-class submarines. Astraea is being designed in parallel to the W93 and will share some non-nuclear components.

== Design ==
The warhead is expected to incorporate improved safety features such as insensitive high explosives. According to the United States Department of Energy, the design will be based on previously tested nuclear components and will not require nuclear testing. However, some critics have called for testing the new design to ensure safety and reliability.

== See also ==
- UGM-133 Trident II
- Trident (UK nuclear programme)
- Astraea - planned British warhead sharing Mark 7 RB
- W68
- W76
- W88
- List of nuclear weapons
