= French submarine Le Terrible (S612) =

French ballistic missile submarine

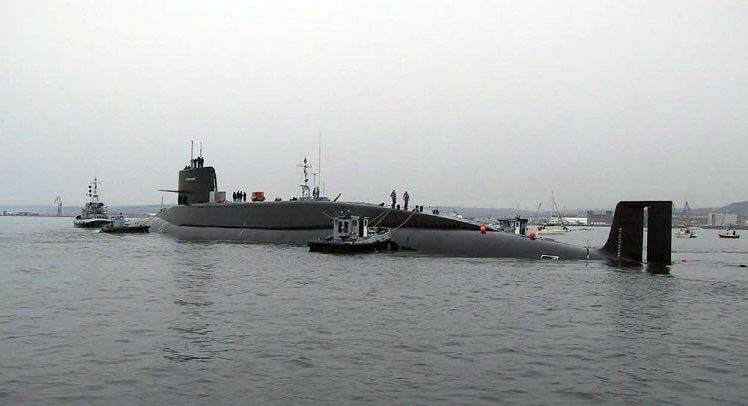
- Le Terrible's sister ship Le Redoutable in 2005

History

France
- Name: Le Terrible
- Builder: Cherbourg Naval Base
- Laid down: 24 June 1967
- Launched: 12 December 1969
- Commissioned: 1 January 1973
- Decommissioned: 1996
- Fate: Awaiting scrapping

General characteristics
- Class & type: Redoutable-class ballistic missile submarine
- Displacement: Surfaced: 7,500 tons; Submerged: 9,000 tons
- Length: 128.0 m (419 ft 11 in)
- Beam: 10.6 m (34 ft 9 in)
- Draft: 10.0 m (32 ft 10 in)
- Installed power: 15,000 shp (11,000 kW)
- Propulsion: 1 × pressurized water-cooled nuclear reactor; 2 × steam turbines; 1 shaft; 1 × diesel engine (backup)
- Speed: Surfaced: 20 knots (37 km/h; 23 mph); Submerged: 25 knots (46 km/h; 29 mph)
- Range: Unlimited
- Complement: 135
- Armament: 16 × SLBM tubes; 4 × bow-mounted 550 mm (22 in) torpedo tubes; 18 × Torpedoes

Le Terrible (S612) was a Redoutable-class ballistic missile submarine operated by the French Navy between 1973 and 1996. One of the first of her kind with the Navy, the boat conducted deterrence patrols as part of the French nuclear triad. After she was decommissioned, the submarine was replaced by Le Terrible (S619).

== Development and design ==
During his premiership in the 1960s, Charles de Gaulle emphasized French autonomy from NATO and the Western Bloc, with a comprehensive military to maintain French sovereignty. A significant element of the doctrine was the development of a nuclear triad outside of American control, which became known as the Force de dissuasion. The seaborn leg of the triad required the domestic development of ballistic missile submarines, which became the main priority of the French Navy (Marine Nationale) for the next decade. The first series of French ballistic missile submarines were known as the Redoutable class.

The six Redoutable-class ballistic missile submarines measured 128.0 metres (419 ft 11 in) long overall, with a beam of 10.6 metres (34 ft 9 in) and a draught of 10.0 metres (32 ft 10 in). The boats displaced 7,500 tons surfaced and 9,000 tons submerged and carried a complement of 135. Propulsion was provided by a single-shaft nuclear power plant consisting of one pressurized water-cooled reactor, two steam turbines, two turbo-alternators, and one electric motor. This machinery produced 15,000 shaft horsepower (11,000 kW) and enabled a maximum speed of 20 knots (37 km/h; 23 mph) surfaced and 25 knots (46 km/h; 29 mph) submerged. An axuiliary diesel engine was carried onboard to get the submarines home if the reactor failed; the engine had a range of 5,000 kilometres (3,100 mi; 2,700 nmi) and an output of 2,670 bhp (1,990 kW). Armament consisted of sixteen submarine-launched ballistic missile tubes and four bow-mounted 550 mm (22 in) torpedo tubes, with 18 torpedoes carried onboard. Sensors fitted included the DUVU-23 and DUUX-2 sonar systems, and the submarines could have a maximum depth of 300 metres (980 ft).

== Service history ==
Le Terrible was the second of the class, and she was laid down at the Cherbourg Naval Base on 24 June 1967, launched on 12 December 1969, and commissioned on 1 January 1973. She joined other members of the class and operated out of Île Longue in Brittany on patrols that lasted between two and three months. Two crews operated the boat in alternating patrols. The submarine was first deployed with the M1 ballistic missile, which was later replaced by the M20, and in turn the M4.

In the late 1990s, the Triomphant class was introduced to replace the Redoutable class on a one-to-one basis, although the last two Triomphant-class boats were cancelled. The first Le Terrible was decommissioned in 1996 and her successor, Le Terrible (S619), was commissioned in 2010. The old submarine was laid up at Cherbourg and scheduled to be dismantled by 2027.
