= AGM-131 SRAM II =

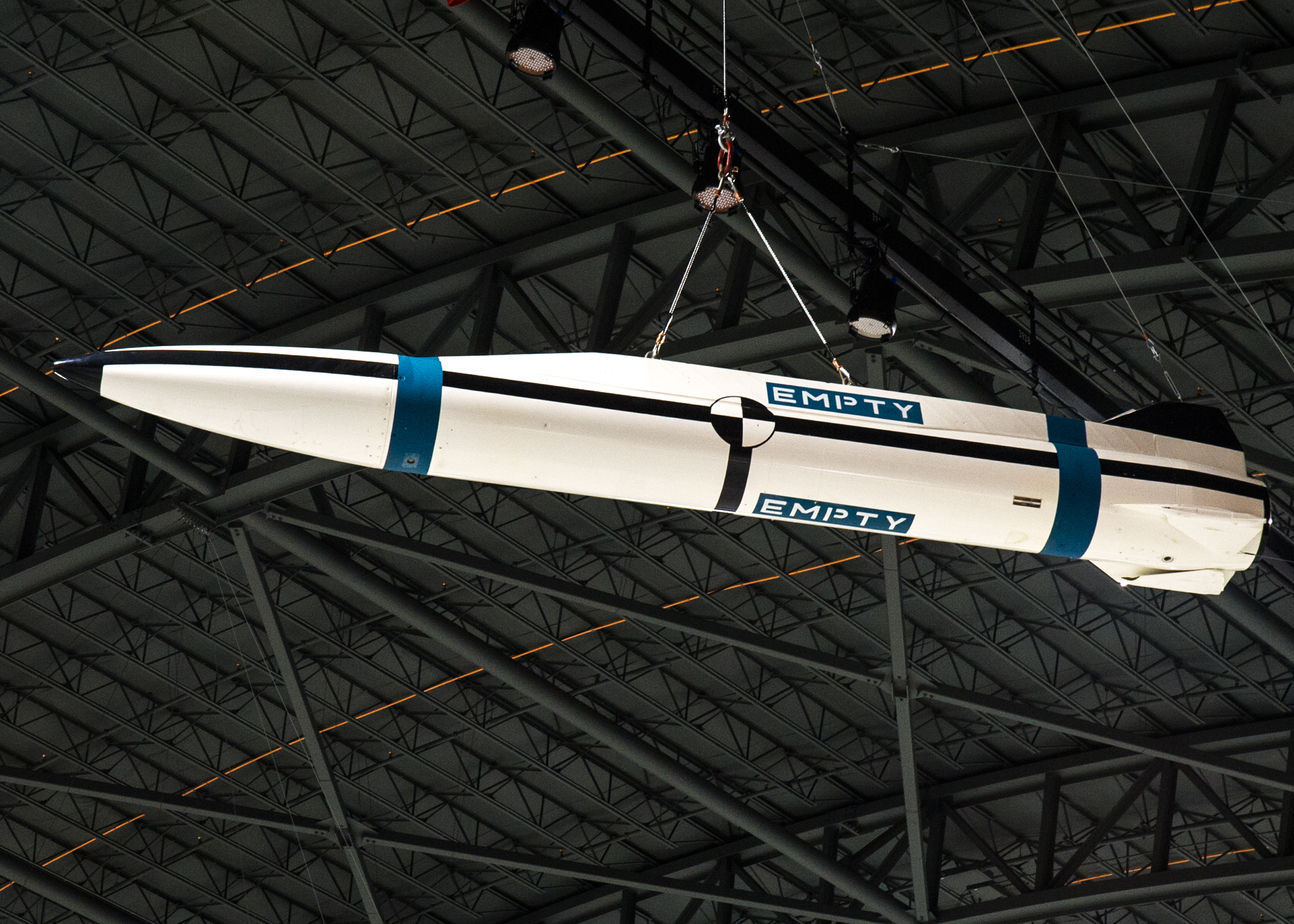
- Casing of a AGM-131 at the National Museum of the United States Air Force
- Type: Nuclear air-to-surface missile
- Place of origin: U.S.

Service history
- In service: Never used

Production history
- Designer: Boeing
- Designed: 1986

Specifications
- Mass: 900 kg (2,000 lb)
- Length: 318 cm (125 in)
- length: 123 cm (48 in)
- Diameter: 39cm
- Warhead: nuclear warhead
- Propellant: Solid-fueled rocket
- Launch platform: Aircraft

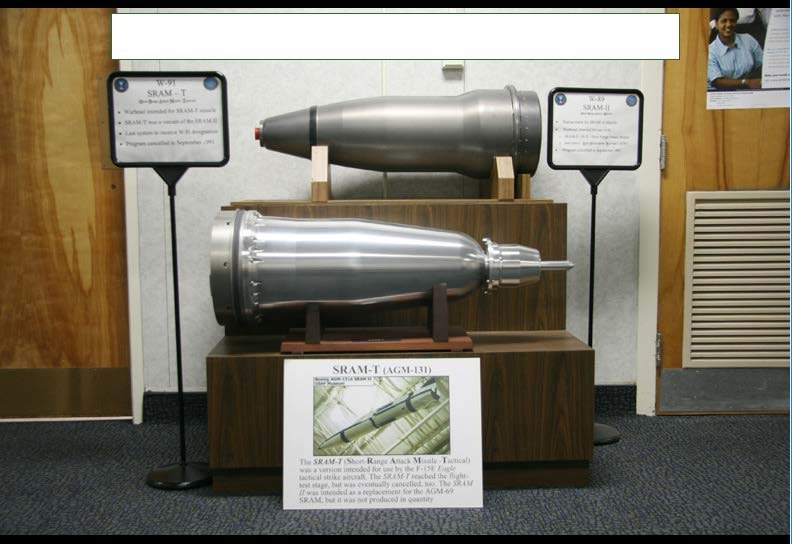
W89 (top) and W91 (bottom) warheads for the SRAM II and SRAM-T respectively.

The AGM-131 SRAM II ("Short-Range Attack Missile") was a nuclear-tipped air-to-surface missile intended as a replacement for the AGM-69 SRAM. The solid-fueled missile was to be dropped from a B-1B Lancer, carry the W89 warhead and have a range of 400 km. However, the program was cancelled by President George H. W. Bush for geopolitical reasons just as the first flight-test missile was delivered.

== Development ==
The mission of the SRAM family is to deliver the warhead to the target without the need for the penetrating bomber to directly overfly the target. The SRAM family of weapons had an extremely small radar signature and were near-impossible to counter. SRAM ensured the airborne leg of the US nuclear triad (the others being land-based ICBMs and SLBM) and was the penetrating air launched strategic nuclear weapon for the B-1 Lancer and B-2 Spirit.

In 1977, the USAF planned to develop an upgrade of the SRAM for the forthcoming B-1A bomber as AGM-69B SRAM B. When the B-1A was cancelled in 1978, the AGM-69B was dropped, too. After the resurrection of the B-1 program (as B-1B) in 1981, it was decided to develop an entirely new weapon, the SRAM II.

In 1986, Boeing was finally awarded a development contract for the AGM-131A SRAM II. The AGM-131A was planned to have only about 2/3 the size of an AGM-69A, so that 36 missiles could be carried by the B-1B, as compared to 24 AGM-69As. The final design of the SRAM II ended up with the "II" version roughly equal to the "A" version in size and about 80% of the weight. One new feature of SRAM II was a lighter, simpler, and more reliable two-pulse solid rocket motor designed by Hercules for increased range and age stability.

The SRAM II was slated to use the newly developed W89 thermonuclear warhead, which being much newer, was also much safer to operate than the W-69 of the AGM-69. The W89 had a 200 kiloton design yield.

Initial Operational Capability for the AGM-131A was planned for 1993, but before flight tests could take place, the program was cancelled in 1991.

== SRAM-T ==
The SRAM II air vehicle was also the basis for a tactical nuclear variant - the SRAM T which employed a different warhead, the W91 thermonuclear warhead, with a selectable yield from 10 to 100 kilotons. It had a longer range than the baseline SRAM II, around 250 miles (approximately 400 kilometers). As a NATO theater nuclear weapon, SRAM-T was to be carried by the F-15E and F-111, but it was also compatible with the F-16 and the Tornado. Deployment was planned for 1995.

== Cancellation ==
Both SRAM II and SRAM T were canceled in September 1991 by President George H.W. Bush, along with the W89 and W91 warheads.

== Specifications ==
Data from designation-systems.net

- Length: 10 ft 5 in (3.18 m)
- Diameter: 15.3 in (390 mm)
- Weight: 2,000 lb (910 kg)
- Speed: Mach 2+
- Range: 250 mi (400 km)
- Propulsion: Thiokol solid-fuel rocket
- Warhead:
  - AGM-131A: W-89 thermonuclear
    - Blast Yield: 200 kilotonnes of TNT (840 TJ)
  - AGM-131B: W-91 thermonuclear
    - Blast Yield: 100 kilotonnes of TNT (420 TJ)
