= W89 =

American thermonuclear warhead design

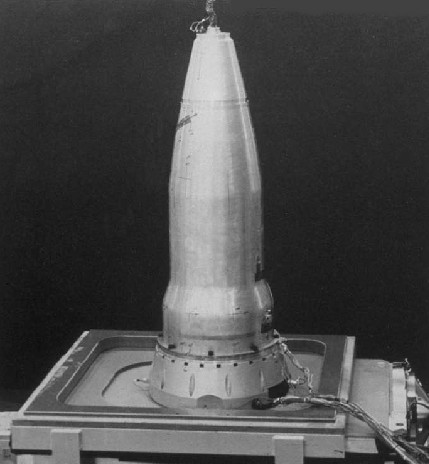
W89 nuclear warhead

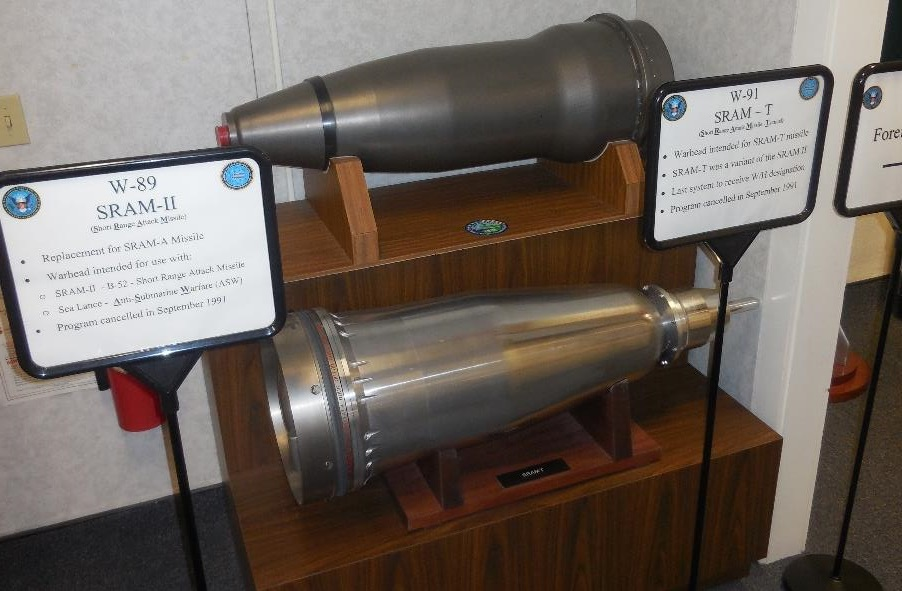
W89 warhead (top)

The W89 was an American thermonuclear warhead design intended for use on the AGM-131 SRAM II air to ground nuclear missile and the UUM-125 Sea Lance anti-submarine missile.

What was to become the W89 design was awarded to the Lawrence Livermore National Laboratory in the mid-1980s. It entered Phase 2A technical definition and cost study in November 1986. It entered Phase 3 development engineering and was assigned the numerical designation W89 in January 1988.

The W89 design was a 13.3-inch (33.8 cm) diameter by 40.8-inch (103.6 cm) long weapon, with a weight of 324 pounds (147 kg) and yield according to unofficial information of 200 kilotons.

The design was canceled in September 1991 along with the SRAM II missile, prior to production of any units, though some test devices may have been manufactured.

== Reused plutonium pits ==
According to one source, the plutonium cores (technically known as pits) of the W89 warheads were planned to be reused from existing W68 warhead pits, which were surplus at the time.

== Reliable Replacement Warhead link ==
Lawrence Livermore engineers have hinted in prior press reports that the Reliable Replacement Warhead design that they were preparing might be based on the W89 warhead design. On March 2, 2007, the NNSA announced that the Lawrence Livermore National Laboratory RRW design had been selected for the initial RRW production version.

One of the selection reasons given was that the LLNL proposed design was more closely tied to historical underground tested warhead designs. It was described by Thomas P. D'Agostino, acting head of the National Nuclear Security Administration, as having been based on a design which was test fired in the 1980s, but never entered service.

LLNL staff have previously hinted in the press that LLNL was considering a design entry based on the tested but never deployed W89 design. The W89 warhead had been proposed as a W88 warhead replacement as early as 1991. The W89 design was already equipped with all then-current safety features, including insensitive high explosives, fire-resistant pits, and advanced detonator safety systems. The W89 was also reportedly designed using recycled pits from the earlier W68 nuclear weapon program, recoated in vanadium to provide the temperature resistance. The W89 warhead was test fired in the 1980s.

== See also ==
- List of nuclear weapons
