= W91 =

American thermonuclear warhead

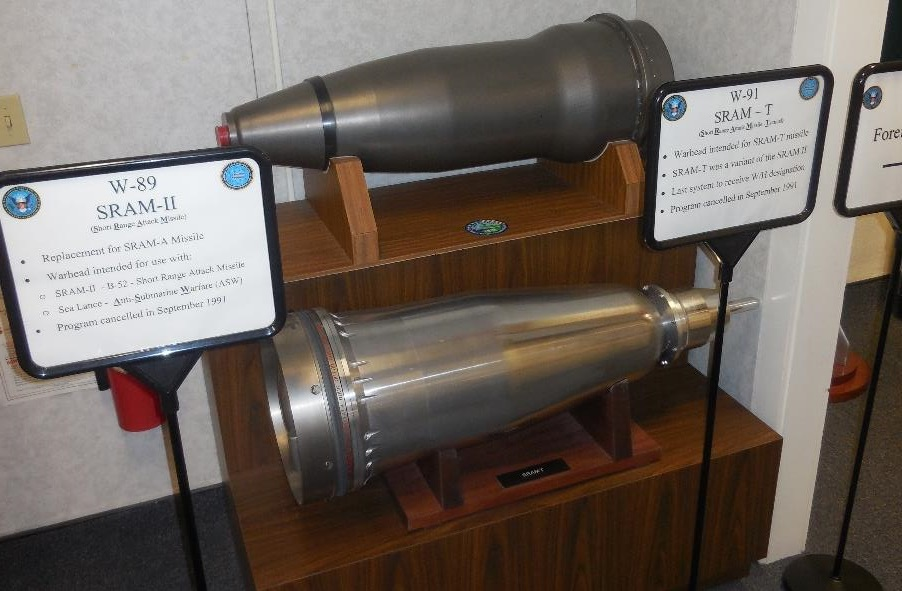
W91 warhead (bottom)

The W91 was an American thermonuclear warhead intended for use on the SRAM-T variant of the AGM-131 SRAM II air to ground missile.

What was to become the W91 design entered into a Phase 2 design competition between the various nuclear weapons laboratories in November 1988. Further development details are somewhat unclear, but a Los Alamos National Laboratory design won the competition.

The design that emerged had a weight of 310 pounds (140 kg), with a two selectable yields of 10 or 100 kilotonnes of TNT (42 or 418 TJ). Other physical characteristics have not been well described in public documents. The design has been described as being named the "New Mexico 1" code name, and as using TATB based insensitive plastic bonded explosive and a fire-resistant nuclear fissile material core or pit.

The design was cancelled in September 1991 along with the SRAM T missile, prior to production of any units, though some test devices may have been manufactured.

Notably, the W91 was the last new US nuclear weapon design to reach the point of receiving a model number designation (entering Phase 3 development status).

== See also ==
- List of nuclear weapons
