= W68 =

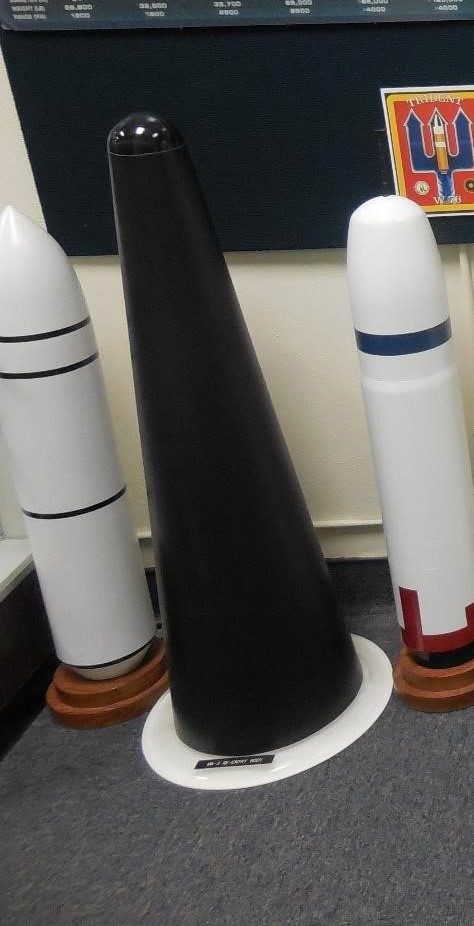
- A W68 warhead in a Mk3 Reentry Body. See image below for scale.
- Type: Nuclear weapon

Service history
- In service: 1971-1991
- Used by: United States

Production history
- Designer: Lawrence Livermore National Laboratory
- Produced: June 1970 - June 1975
- No. built: 5250

Specifications
- Mass: 150 pounds (68 kg)
- Detonation mechanism: Contact, airburst
- Blast yield: 40 kilotonnes of TNT (170 TJ)

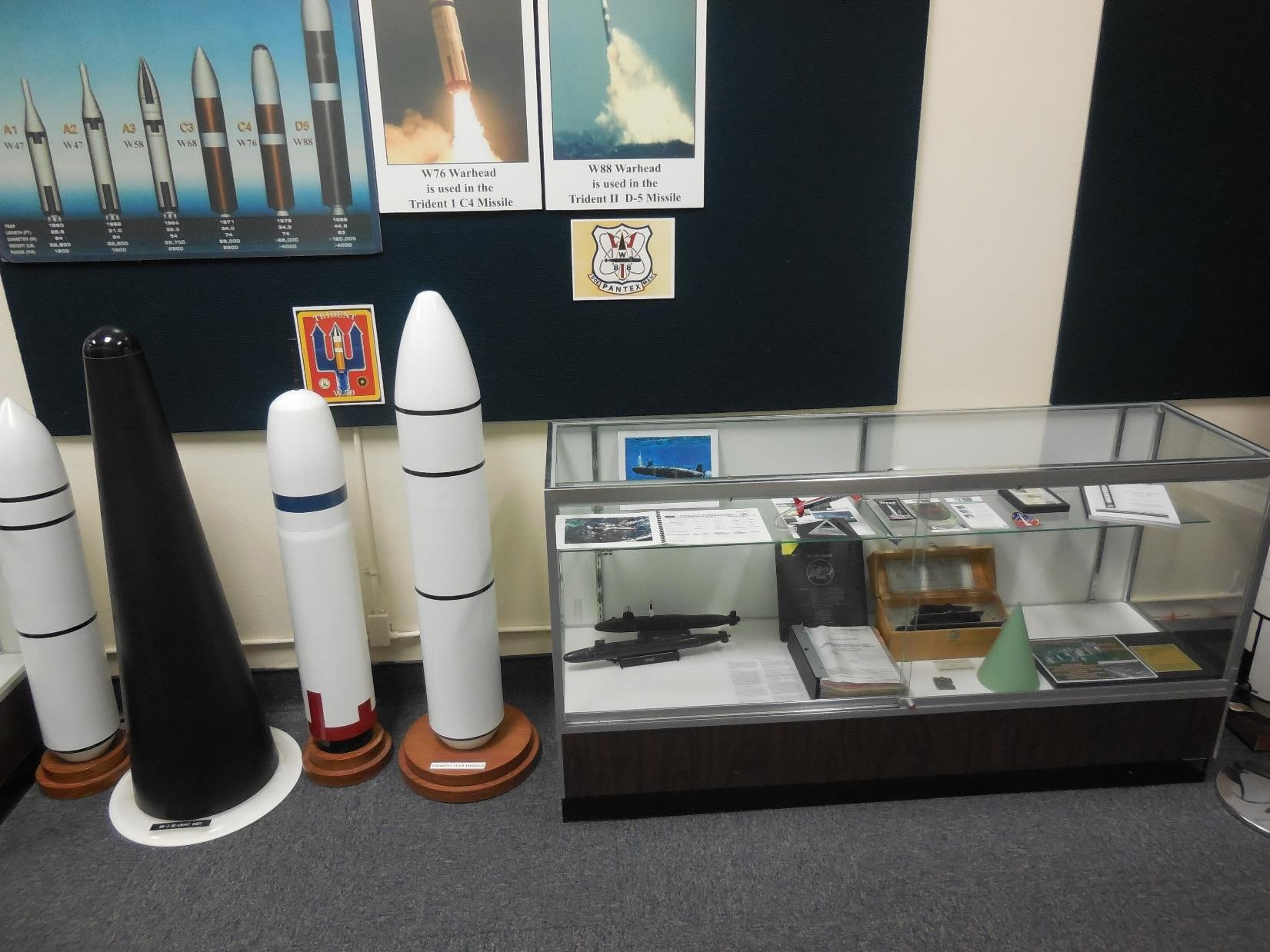
W68 with table and models for scale.

The W68 warhead was the warhead used on the UGM-73 Poseidon SLBM missile. It was developed in the late 1960s at Lawrence Livermore National Laboratory.

== Specifications ==
The W68 weighed 150 pounds (68 kg) and had an official design yield of 40 kilotonnes of TNT (170 TJ).

The design was revolutionary and impacted many following systems with its achievements in warhead miniaturization.

The W68 had four fuzing options: low altitude radar with contact backup, high altitude radar with timer backup, high altitude timer with impact backup and impact fuzing.

== Production and deployment ==
A total of 5,250 W68 warheads were produced, the single largest production run of any American nuclear weapon model. It was manufactured starting in June 1970 and ending in June 1975. Each Poseidon missile could carry up to 14 warheads; at the peak deployment, there were 31 US Poseidon submarines with 16 missiles each, for a total of 496 deployed missiles, at a density of about 10 warheads per missile.

=== Safety issues and later service ===
Aging of the LX-09 polymer-bonded explosive used in the W68 led to decomposition of the explosive, separating the binder and plasticizer, which then caused deterioration of the detonators. This required the whole production run to be retired or remanufactured with LX-10 and LX-10-1 as new explosives from November 1978 through 1983; about 2,000 units were retired starting in 1977 rather than rebuilt.

The remaining 3,200 warheads remained in service longer, with the last units retired in 1991.

== See also ==
- UGM-73 Poseidon
- W76
- W88
- W93
- List of nuclear weapons
