= W76 =

US - UK thermonuclear warhead of the 1970s

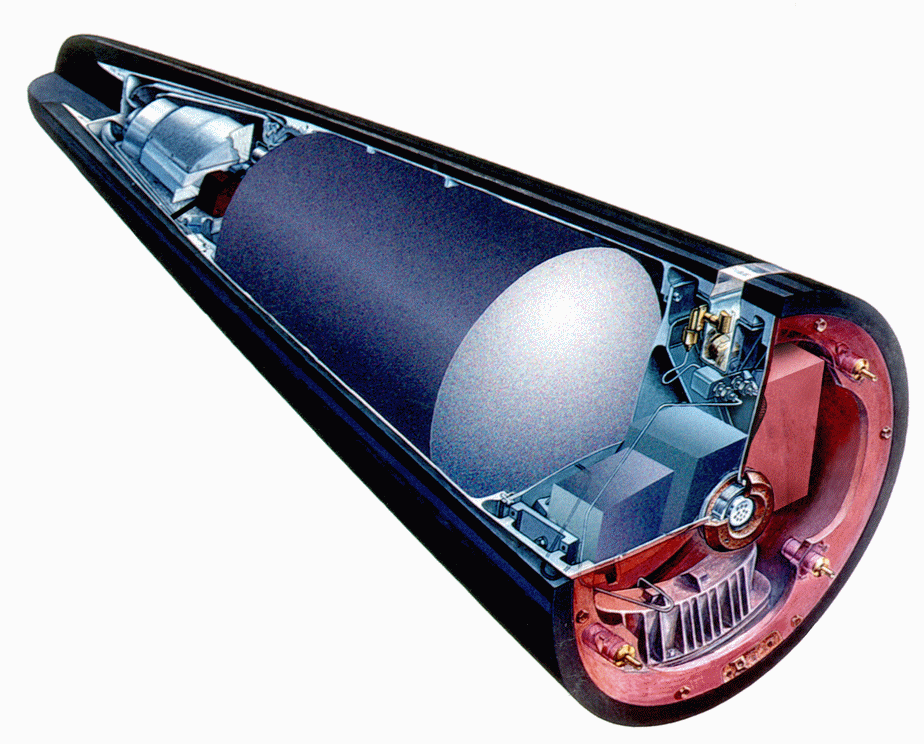
- The W76 warhead and Mk-4 re-entry vehicle (cutaway diagram) – Los Alamos National Labs image
- Type: Nuclear weapon

Service history
- In service: 1978–present
- Used by: United States; United Kingdom (see Trident Nuclear Program)

Production history
- Designer: Los Alamos National Laboratory
- Designed: 1973–1978
- Manufacturer: Pantex Plant
- Produced: Original: 1978–1987; W76-1: 2008–2018; W76-2: 2018–2024
- No. built: ~3,400
- Variants: 3

Specifications
- Mass: 95 kg (209 lb)
- Length: 1,300 mm (51 in)
- Diameter: 400 mm (16 in)
- Detonation mechanism: Contact, airburst
- Blast yield: Original: 100 kt W76-1: 90 kt W76-2: 5–7 kt

The W76 is an American thermonuclear warhead, designed for use on the UGM-96 Trident I submarine-launched ballistic missiles (SLBMs) and subsequently moved to the UGM-133 Trident II as Trident I was phased out of service. The original warhead, retroactively called the W76 mod 0 (W76-0) variant was manufactured from 1978 to 1987. It was gradually replaced by the W76 mod 1 (W76-1) between 2008 and 2018, completely replacing the W76-0 in the active stockpile. In 2018, it was announced that some W76-1 warheads would be converted to a new low-yield W76 mod 2 (W76-2) variant. The first W76-2 warheads were deployed in late 2019.

== History ==
The warhead was initially manufactured from 1978 to 1987 and designed by Los Alamos National Laboratory. It was initially fitted to the Trident I SLBM system, but after the Rocky Flats plant where its successor the W88 was being made was shut down in 1989 after a production run of only 400 warheads, it was decided to transfer W76 warheads to Trident II.

A life extension program (LEP) for 800 warheads was approved by the US government in 2000, then later increased to 2,000. The purpose of the LEP was to extend service life by 20 years and add new safety features. In September 2008, production on the W76-1 started. In December 2018, the National Nuclear Security Administration completed updating all W76 warheads to the W76-1 design.

The 2018 Nuclear Posture Review announced that a new variant would be manufactured. The W76-2 variant is described as a low-yield warhead, estimated at 5-7 kilotons of TNT equivalent. In January 2019, the National Nuclear Security Administration announced that it had started to manufacture the W76-2. Initial operating capability was expected in the final quarter of 2019, and manufacturing is expected to last through FY2024 at the Pantex Plant.

According to the FAS, the W76-2 warhead was first deployed with USS Tennessee during its late 2019 operational patrol. In February 2020, the US Department of Defense confirmed that the W76-2 had been 'fielded'.

The warhead is currently the most numerous weapon in the US nuclear arsenal, having replaced the 50 kt W68 that was fitted to the Poseidon SLBM in that capacity.

The United Kingdom operates a nuclear weapon based on the W76 mod-1 design, under the name "Holbrook".

== Design ==
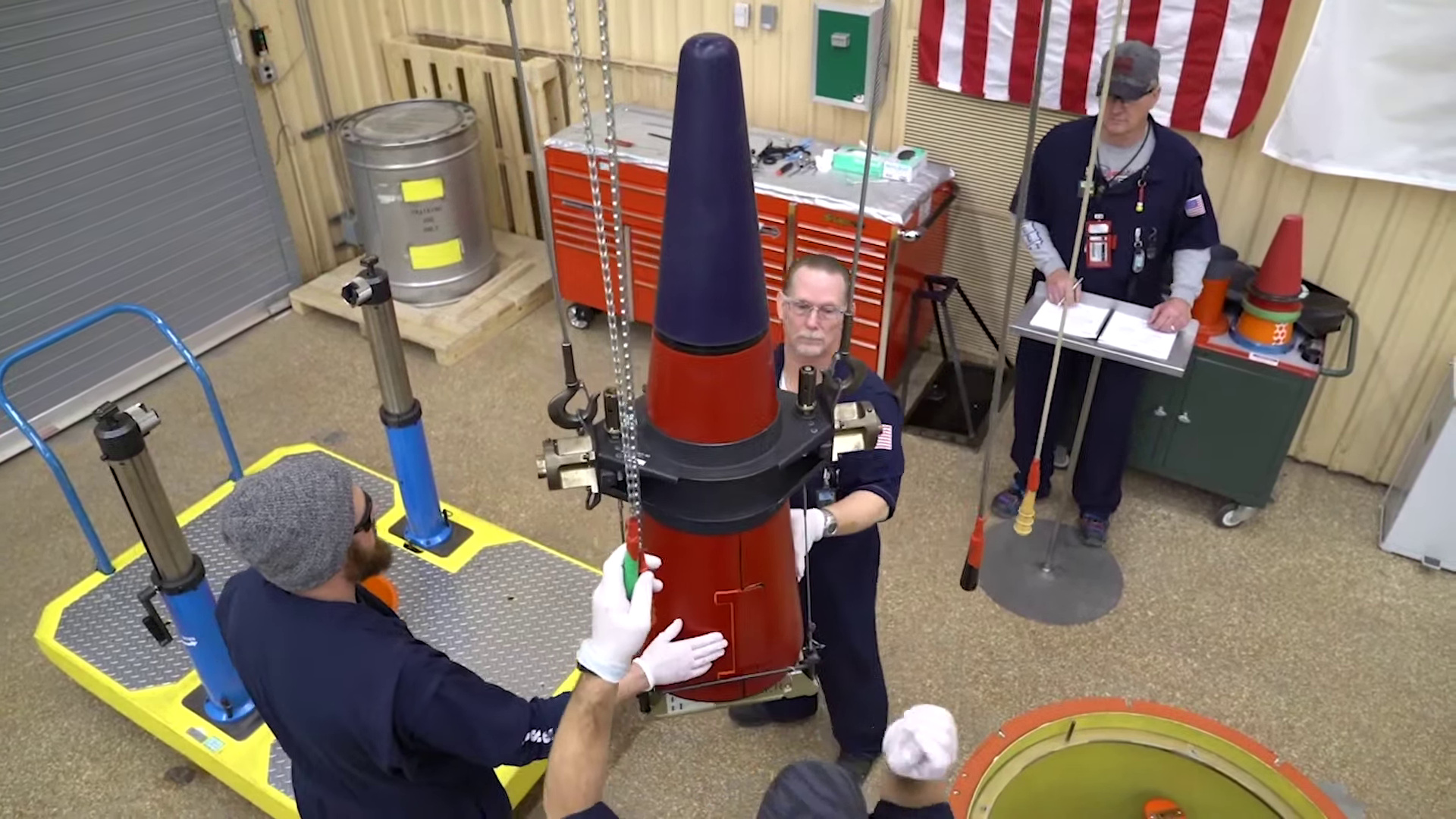
A W76-1

The Mk4 reentry vehicle is 1,300 millimetres (51 in) and 400 millimetres (16 in) in diameter. The dimensions of the W76 thermonuclear warhead are unknown.

The W76-0 had a design yield of 100 kilotons. Its replacement, the W76-1, has a yield of 90 kilotons. The W76-2 has an estimated yield of 5 to 7 kilotons.

The W76-0 was fitted inside a Mk4 reentry vehicle (reentry body in US Navy parlance). The W76-1 and -2 are fitted inside the new Mk4A reentry vehicle. The reentry vehicle and warhead weight is estimated to be approximately 95 kilograms (209 lb).

During the W76-1 LEP, the warhead was fitted with a new MC4700 arming, fuzing and firing (AF&F) system, the so-called "super-fuze". The MC4700 AF&F system increases warhead kill probabilities against hard targets such as silos and bunkers. It achieves this by first calculating the range to the target outside of the atmosphere (i.e. before the atmosphere can alter the warhead's trajectory) and then continuously calculates its position on a line based on acceleration.

If the contact fuze is actuated, such as falling short or striking on target, the warhead detonates. If the fuze calculates it has overshot the target, it detonates the warhead before it can leave the kill radius of the target. The kill radius is a sphere, not a circle. In comparison, a warhead without such a smart fuze would continue flying when overshooting a target, leaving the kill radius, where detonating would destroy the target, and impact the ground. This would actuate the impact fuze and detonate the warhead, outside of the kill radius.

== See also ==
- RSM-56 Bulava – missile in the Russian arsenal with warheads of comparable yield
- W68
- W88
- W93
- List of nuclear weapons
