= W88 =

United States thermonuclear warhead

- Diagram of the W88 warhead: In 1999, information was released showing that in the W88, the primary (top) is egg-shaped, while the secondary (bottom) is spherical.
- Type: Nuclear weapon

Service history
- In service: 1989–present
- Used by: United States Navy

Production history
- Designer: Los Alamos National Laboratory
- Designed: 1970s to 1980s
- Manufacturer: Rocky Flats
- Produced: 1988–1989 (full production)
- No. built: ~400

Specifications
- Mass: 175–180 kilograms (386–397 lb)
- Length: Approximately 60 inches (150 cm)
- Diameter: 18 inches (46 cm)
- Detonation mechanism: Contact, airburst
- Blast yield: 475 kilotons of TNT (1,990 TJ)

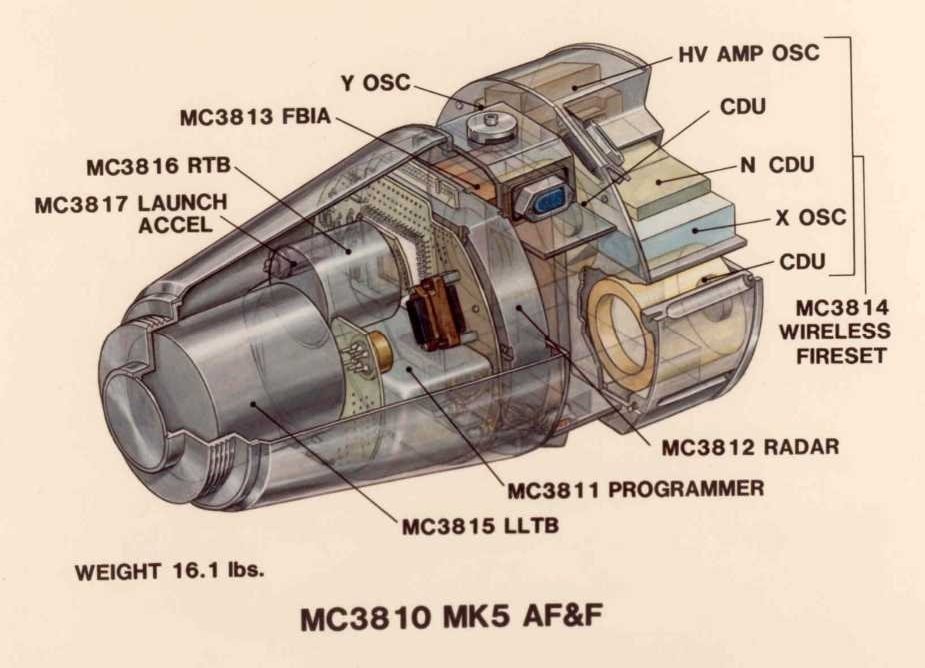
MC3810 Mk5 Arming, Fuzing and Firing system used on the W88

The W88 is an American thermonuclear warhead, with an estimated yield of 475 kilotons of TNT (1,990 terajoules), and is small enough to fit on missiles with multiple independently targetable reentry vehicles (MIRV). The W88 was designed at the Los Alamos National Laboratory in the 1970s and first placed into service in 1989. The director of Los Alamos who had presided over its development described it as "the most advanced U.S. nuclear warhead". The latest version is the W88 ALT 370, the first unit of which came into production on 1 July 2021, after 11 years of development. The Trident II, a submarine-launched ballistic missile (SLBM) can be armed with up to eight W88 warheads. The W88 is set to become the highest-yield warhead in the US arsenal when the B83 nuclear bomb is retired likely before 2027.

== History ==
Much of the work was done on the warhead by Los Alamos National Laboratory before the introduction of the Threshold Test Ban Treaty in 1976. A production run of 4000 to 5000 warheads was initially envisioned but production was halted after the November 1989 raid on the Rocky Flats Plant by the FBI. Consideration was given to restarting production but the program was terminated in January 1992. Final production was approximately 400 warheads.

== Design revelations ==
Information about the W88 has implied that it is a variation of the standard Teller–Ulam design for thermonuclear weapons. In a thermonuclear weapon such as the W88, nuclear fission in the primary stage causes nuclear fusion in the secondary stage, which results in the main explosion. Although the weapon employs fusion in the secondary, most of the explosive yield comes from fission of nuclear material in the primary, secondary, and casing.

In 1999, the San Jose Mercury News reported that the W88 had an egg-shaped primary and a spherical secondary, which were together inside a radiation case known as the "peanut" for its shape. (Note: The code-name of the primary was Komodo and that of the secondary was Cursa, which come from the names of a ferocious lizard, the Komodo dragon, and a bright star, Cursa.) Four months later, The New York Times reported that in 1995 a supposed double agent from the People's Republic of China delivered information indicating that China knew these details about the W88 warhead as well, supposedly through espionage (this line of investigation eventually resulted in the abortive trial of Wen Ho Lee). If these stories are true, it would indicate a variation of the Teller-Ulam design which would allow for the miniaturization required for small MIRVed warheads.

The value of an egg-shaped primary lies apparently in the fact that a MIRV warhead is limited by the diameter of the primary—if an egg-shaped primary can be made to work properly, then the MIRV warhead can be made considerably smaller yet still deliver a high-yield explosion—a W88 warhead manages to yield up to 475 kt with a reentry vehicle length of approximately 60 inches (1,500 mm) and base diameter of 18 inches (460 mm) while the actual physics package is 35 inches (890 mm) long. By different estimates the warhead has been given weights of 175 kilograms (386 lb), 180 kilograms (400 lb), and 360 kilograms (790 lb). The smaller warhead allows more of them to fit onto a single missile and improves basic flight properties such as speed and range.

The calculations for a nonspherical primary are apparently orders of magnitude more difficult than for a spherical primary. A spherically symmetric simulation is one-dimensional, while an axially symmetric simulation is two dimensional. Simulations typically divide up each dimension into discrete segments, so a one-dimensional simulation might involve only 100 points, while a similarly accurate two dimensional simulation would require 10,000. This would likely be the reason they would be desirable for a country like the People's Republic of China, which already developed its own nuclear and thermonuclear weapons, especially since they were no longer conducting nuclear testing which would provide valuable design information.

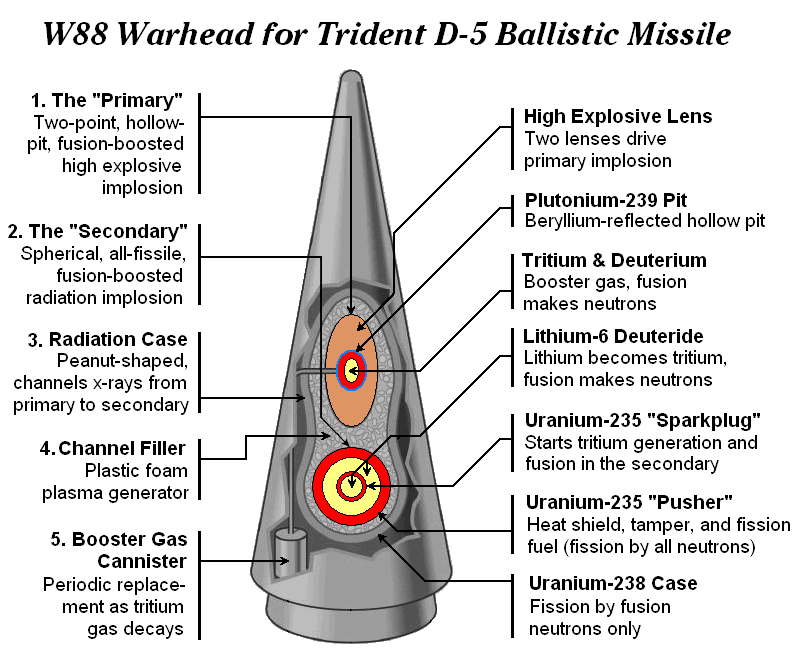

The weapon contains the material Fogbank. While its precise nature is classified, Fogbank is believed to be a foam or aerogel material used in the weapon's interstage.

=== Komodo ===
The Komodo is a United States fission nuclear bomb used as the primary for W88. It was designed by Los Alamos scientist Ralph Douglas Johnson. Most details about the bomb remain classified. Some information was released during the espionage trial of Taiwanese-American Los Alamos scientist Wen Ho Lee. This included its name, and the name of the "Cursa" thermonuclear second stage (named for the star). It is a plutonium implosion weapon, with a hollow core, for deuterium and tritium injection immediately prior to detonation for fusion boosting. Also detailed was its prolate spheroid shape, variously referred to as a football or watermelon-shaped, which indicates a two-point implosion design, similar to most previous warhead primaries.

From 1992, China began testing similar aspherical primary devices. Los Alamos nuclear primary designer John Richter believed that China's low-yield September 25, 1992 nuclear test was an espionage-derived copycat of the Komodo primary, but this has since been disputed.

== See also ==
- W68
- W76
- W93
- W87 – another warhead of the same era as the W88, which is commonly thought to share a common secondary design with the W88, and uses a similar reentry vehicle to the W88
- List of nuclear weapons
- Timeline of the Cox Report controversy
