= Spritsail (square-rigged) =

Type of sail

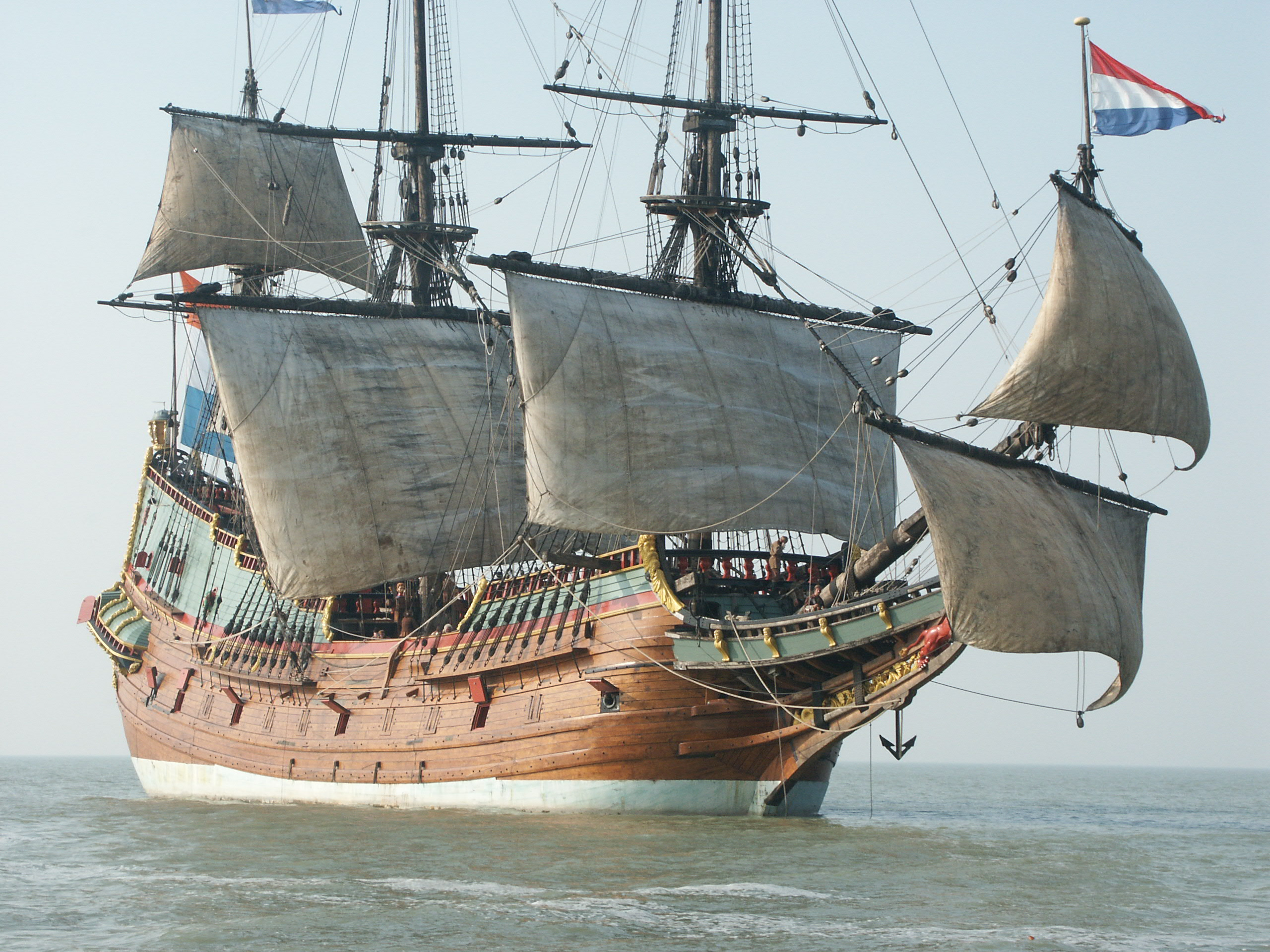
A replica of the Batavia setting a spritsail (lower right) and a sprit-topsail

On large sailing ships a spritsail is a square-rigged sail carried on a yard below the bowsprit.

In some languages (such as German) it is known as a "blind" (German, (eine) Blinde) because it effectively blocks forward vision when set.

Spritsails were commonly used on sailing vessels from the first carracks until about 1800. Until the mid-18th century, most ships also set a sprit-topsail from the short sprit topmast that rose vertically above the fore end of the bowsprit.

The full-rigged ships of the golden age of sail had no spritsails, as the area under the bowsprit was instead occupied by rigging (martingales and dolphin striker) that reinforced the bowsprit and jib-boom against the forces of an increasing number of jibs.
