= Mast (sailing) =

Pole used in rigging of a sailing vessel

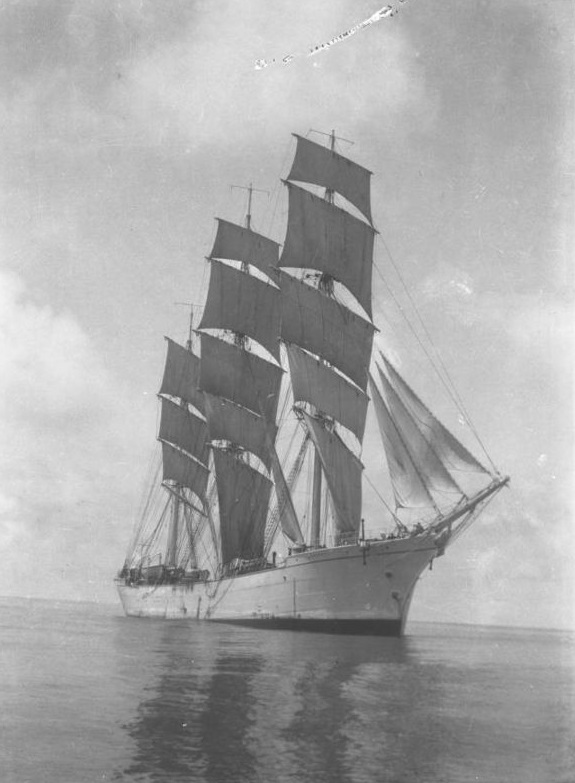
Three-masted training ship Mersey (c. 1908-1915)

The mast of a sailing vessel is a tall spar, or arrangement of spars, erected vertically or near-vertically on the median line of a ship or boat. A mast may carry sails, spars, and derricks. It may also give necessary height to a navigation light, look-out position, signal yard, control position, radio aerial, or signal lamp. Large ships have several masts, with the size and configuration depending on the style of ship. Nearly all sailing masts are guyed.

Until the mid-19th century, all vessels' masts were made of wood, formed from one or several pieces of timber. This was typically the trunk of a single conifer tree; however, from the 16th century, vessels were often built too large for that. Larger vessels needed taller and thicker masts, which could not be made from single tree trunks. To achieve the required height, these masts were built from up to four sections (also called masts). From lowest to highest, these were called "lower", "top", "topgallant", and "royal" masts. In addition, the lower sections themselves needed to be built from multiple pieces of wood to make them thick enough. Sections made from multiple pieces were known as made masts, while a section formed from a single piece was known as a pole mast.

Those who specialised in making masts were known as mastmakers.

== Nomenclature ==
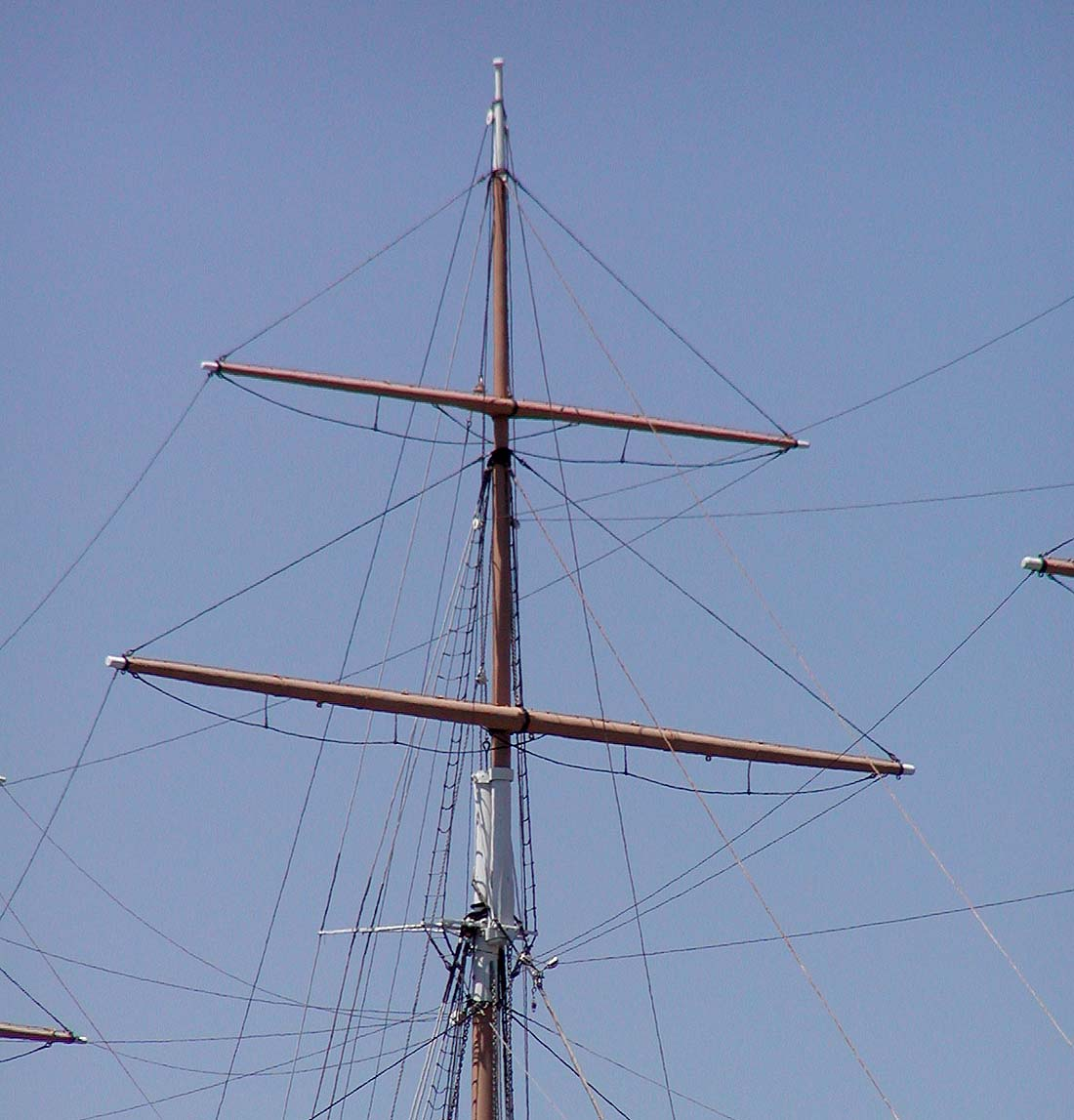
Main topgallant mast

For square-sail carrying ships, masts in their standard names in bow to stern (front to back) order, are:

- Sprit topmast: a small mast set on the end of the bowsprit (discontinued after the early 18th century); not usually counted as a mast, however, when identifying a ship as "two-masted" or "three-masted"
- Fore-mast: the mast nearest the bow, or the mast forward of the main-mast. As it is the furthest afore, it may be rigged to the bowsprit.
  - Sections: fore-mast lower, fore topmast, fore topgallant mast
- Main-mast: the tallest mast, usually located near the center of the ship
  - Sections: main-mast lower, main topmast, main topgallant mast, royal mast (if fitted)
- Mizzen-mast: the aft-most mast. Typically shorter than the fore-mast.
  - Sections: mizzen-mast lower, mizzen topmast, mizzen topgallant mast

Some names given to masts in ships carrying other types of rig (where the naming is less standardised) are:

- Bonaventure mizzen: the fourth mast on larger 16th-century galleons, typically lateen-rigged and shorter than the main mizzen.
- Jigger-mast: typically, where it is the shortest, the aftmost mast on vessels with more than three masts.
  - Sections: jigger-mast lower, jigger topmast, jigger topgallant mast

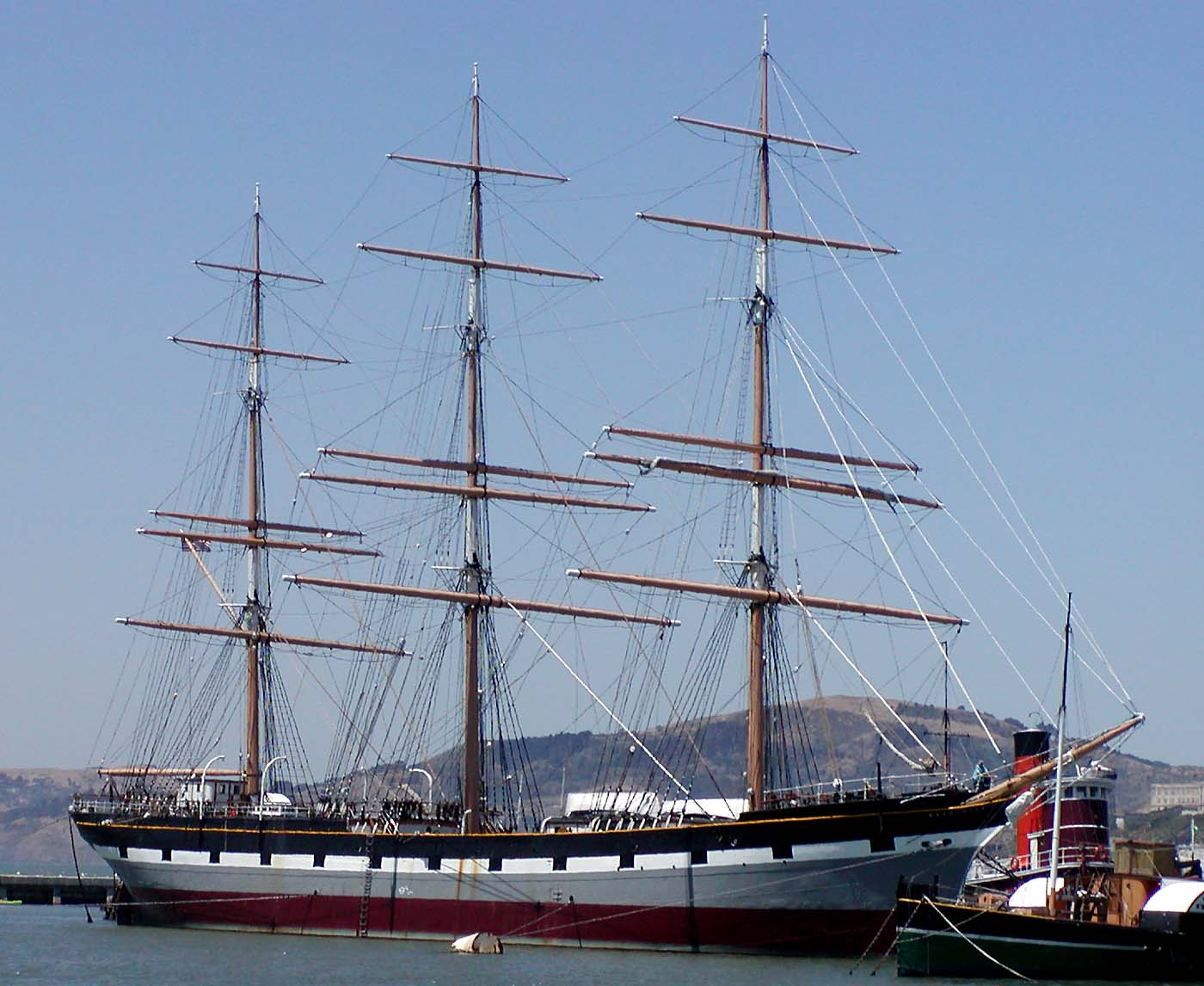
This photo of the full-rigged ship Balclutha, shows the fore-mast, main-mast and mizzen-mast, as well as all the ship's standing and running rigging.

When a vessel has two masts, as a general rule, the main mast is the one setting the largest sail. Therefore, in a brig, the forward mast is the foremast and the after mast is the mainmast. In a schooner with two masts, even if the masts are of the same height, the after one usually carries a larger sail (because a longer boom can be used), so the after mast is the mainmast. This contrasts with a ketch or a yawl, where the after mast, and its principal sail, is clearly the smaller of the two, so the terminology is (from forward) mainmast and mizzen. (In a yawl, the term "jigger" is occasionally used for the aftermast.)

Some two-masted luggers have a fore-mast and a mizzen-mast – there is no main-mast. This is because these traditional types used to have three masts, but it was found convenient to dispense with the main-mast and carry larger sails on the remaining masts. This gave more working room, particularly on fishing vessels.

On square-rigged vessels, each mast carries several horizontal yards from which the individual sails are rigged.

Folding mast ships use a tabernacle anchor point. Definitions include: "the partly open socket or double post on the deck, into which a mast is fixed, with a pivot near the top so that the mast can be lowered"; "large bracket attached firmly to the deck, to which the foot of the mast is fixed; it has two sides or cheeks and a bolt forming the pivot around which the mast is raised and lowered"; "substantial fitting for mounting the mast on deck, so that it can be lowered easily for trailering or for sailing under bridges", "hinged device allowing for the easy folding of a mast 90 degrees from perpendicular, as for transporting the boat on a trailer, or passing under a bridge"

== History ==
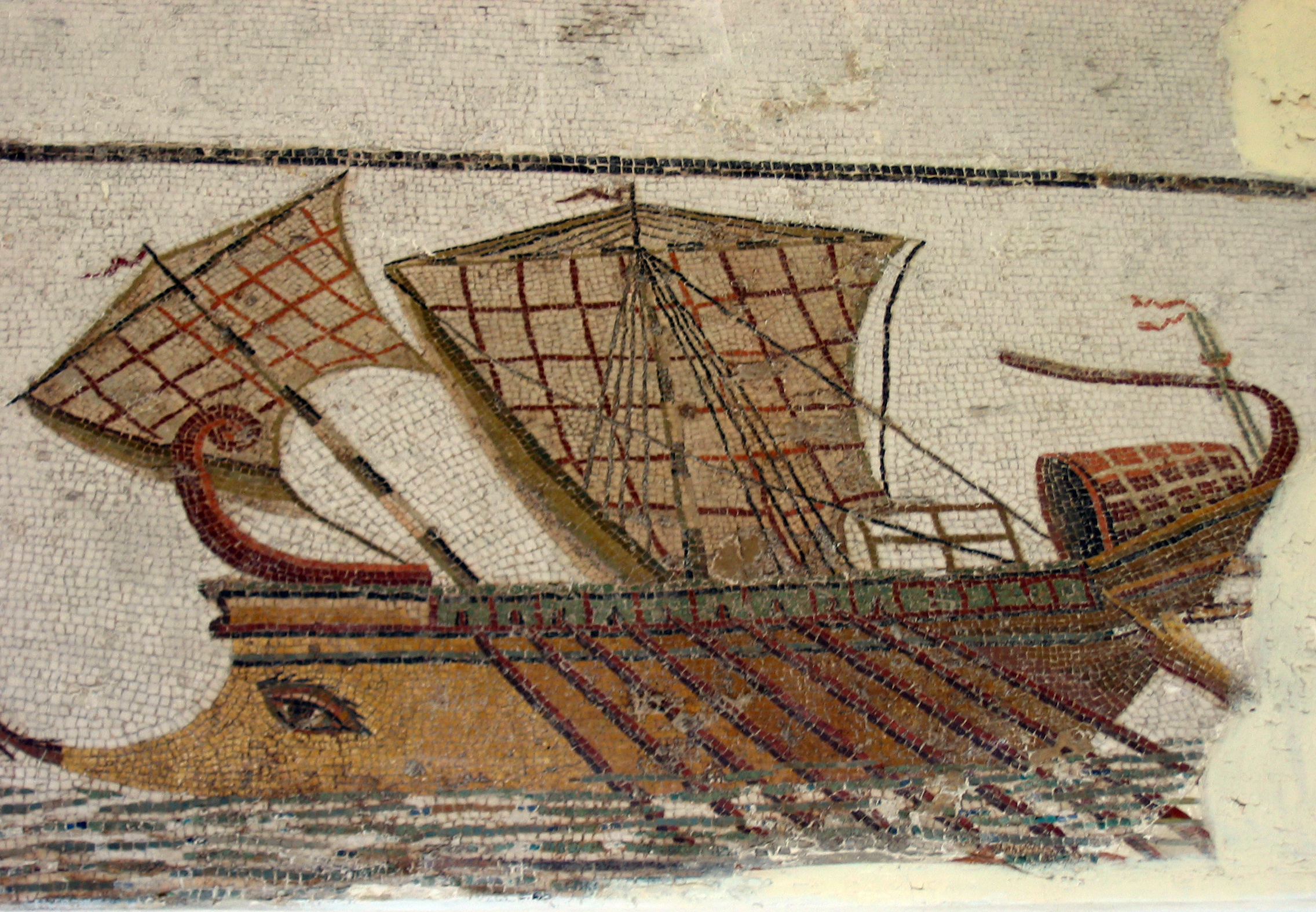
Roman two-masted ship, its foremast showing a typically strong forward rake

The oldest evidence for the use of masts comes from the Ubaid period site of H3 in Kuwait, dating to the second half of the sixth millennium BC. Here, a clay disc made from a sherd that appears to depict a reed bundle boat with two masts has been recovered.

In the West, the concept of a ship carrying more than one mast, to give it more speed under sail and to improve its sailing qualities, evolved in northern Mediterranean waters: The earliest foremast has been identified on an Etruscan pyxis from Caere, Italy, dating to the mid-7th century BC: a warship with a furled mainsail is engaging an enemy vessel, deploying a foresail. A two-masted merchant vessel with a sizable foresail rigged on a slightly inclined foremast is depicted in an Etruscan tomb painting from 475 to 450 BC. An artemon (Greek for foresail) almost the same size as the galley's mainsail can be found on a Corinthian krater as early as the late 6th century BC; apart from that Greek longships are uniformly shown without it until the 4th century BC. In the East, ancient Indian Kingdoms like the Kalinga from as early as 2nd century are believed to have commanded naval sail ships. One of the earliest documented evidence of Indian sail building comes from the mural of the three-masted ship in Ajanta caves that date back to 400–500 CE.

The foremast became fairly common on Roman galleys, where, inclined at an angle of 45°, it was more akin to a bowsprit, and the foresail set on it, reduced in size, seems to be used rather as an aid to steering than for propulsion. While most of the ancient evidence is iconographic, the existence of foremasts can also be deduced archaeologically from slots in foremast-feets located too close to the prow for a mainsail.

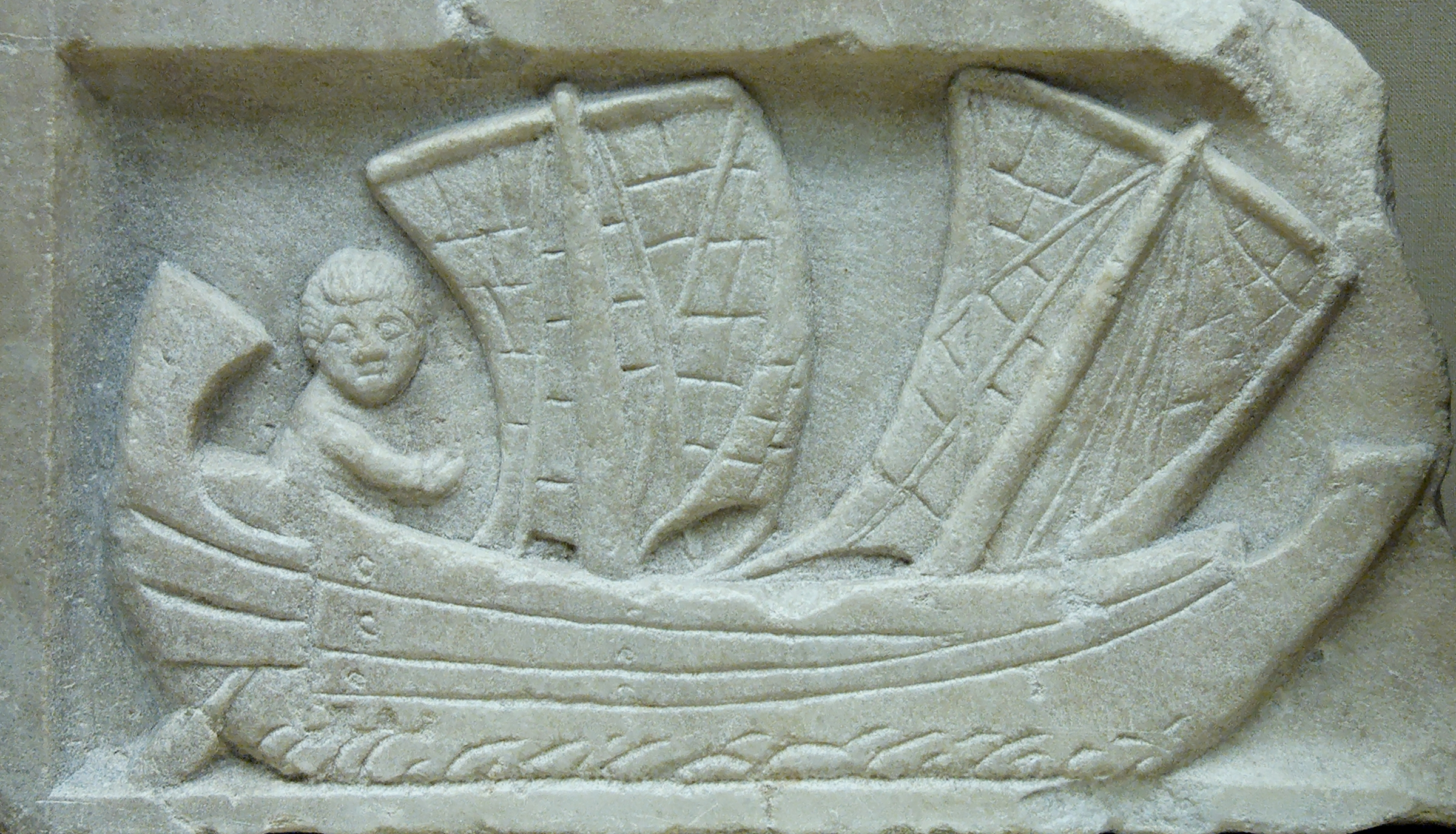
Roman merchantman (corbita) with mainmast and foremast under sail

Artemon, along with mainsail and topsail, developed into the standard rig of seagoing vessels in imperial times, complemented by a mizzen on the largest freighters. The earliest recorded three-masters were the giant Syracusia, a prestige object commissioned by king Hiero II of Syracuse and devised by the polymath Archimedes around 240 BC, and other Syracusan merchant ships of the time. The imperial grain freighters travelling the routes between Alexandria and Rome also included three-masted vessels. A mosaic in Ostia (c. 200 AD) depicts a freighter with a three-masted rig entering Rome's harbour. Special craft could carry many more masts: Theophrastus (Hist. Plant. 5.8.2) records how the Romans imported Corsican timber by way of a huge raft propelled by as many as fifty masts and sails.

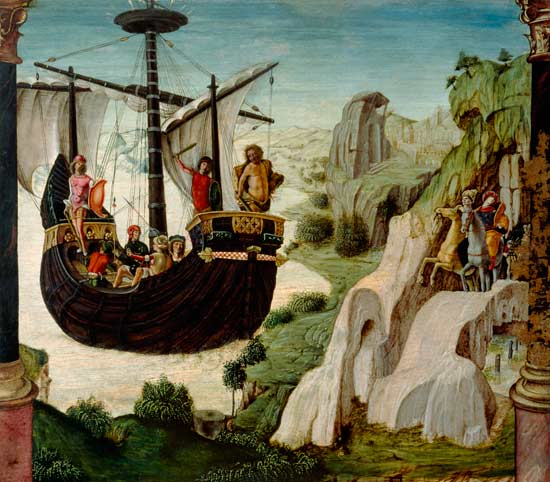
Renaissance three-master by Lorenzo Costa

Throughout antiquity, both foresail and mizzen remained secondary in terms of canvas size, although large enough to require full running rigging. In late antiquity, the foremast lost most of its tilt, standing nearly upright on some ships.

By the onset of the Early Middle Ages, rigging had undergone a fundamental transformation in Mediterranean navigation: the lateen which had long evolved on smaller Greco-Roman craft replaced the square rig, the chief sail type of the ancients, that practically disappeared from the record until the 14th century (while it remained dominant in northern Europe). The dromon, the lateen-rigged and oared bireme of the Byzantine navy, almost certainly had two masts, a larger foremast and one midships. Their length has been estimated at 12 m and 8 m respectively, somewhat smaller than the Sicilian war galleys of the time.

Multiple-masted sailing ships were reintroduced into the Mediterranean Sea by the Late Middle Ages. Large vessels were coming more and more into use and the need for additional masts to control these ships adequately grew with the increase in tonnage. Unlike in antiquity, the mizzen-mast was adopted on medieval two-masters earlier than the foremast, a process which can be traced back by pictorial evidence from Venice and Barcelona to the mid-14th century. To balance out the sail plan the next obvious step was to add a mast fore of the main-mast, which first appears in a Catalan ink drawing from 1409. With the three-masted ship established, propelled by square rig and lateen, and guided by the pintle-and-gudgeon rudder, all advanced ship design technology necessary for the great transoceanic voyages was in place by the beginning of the 15th century.

The first hollow mast was fitted on the American sloop Maria in 1845, 28 m (92 ft) long and built of staves bound with iron hoops like a barrel. Other hollow masts were made from two tapered timbers hollowed and glued together. Nearly a century later, the simple box form of mast was arrived at.

== Modern sailing masts ==
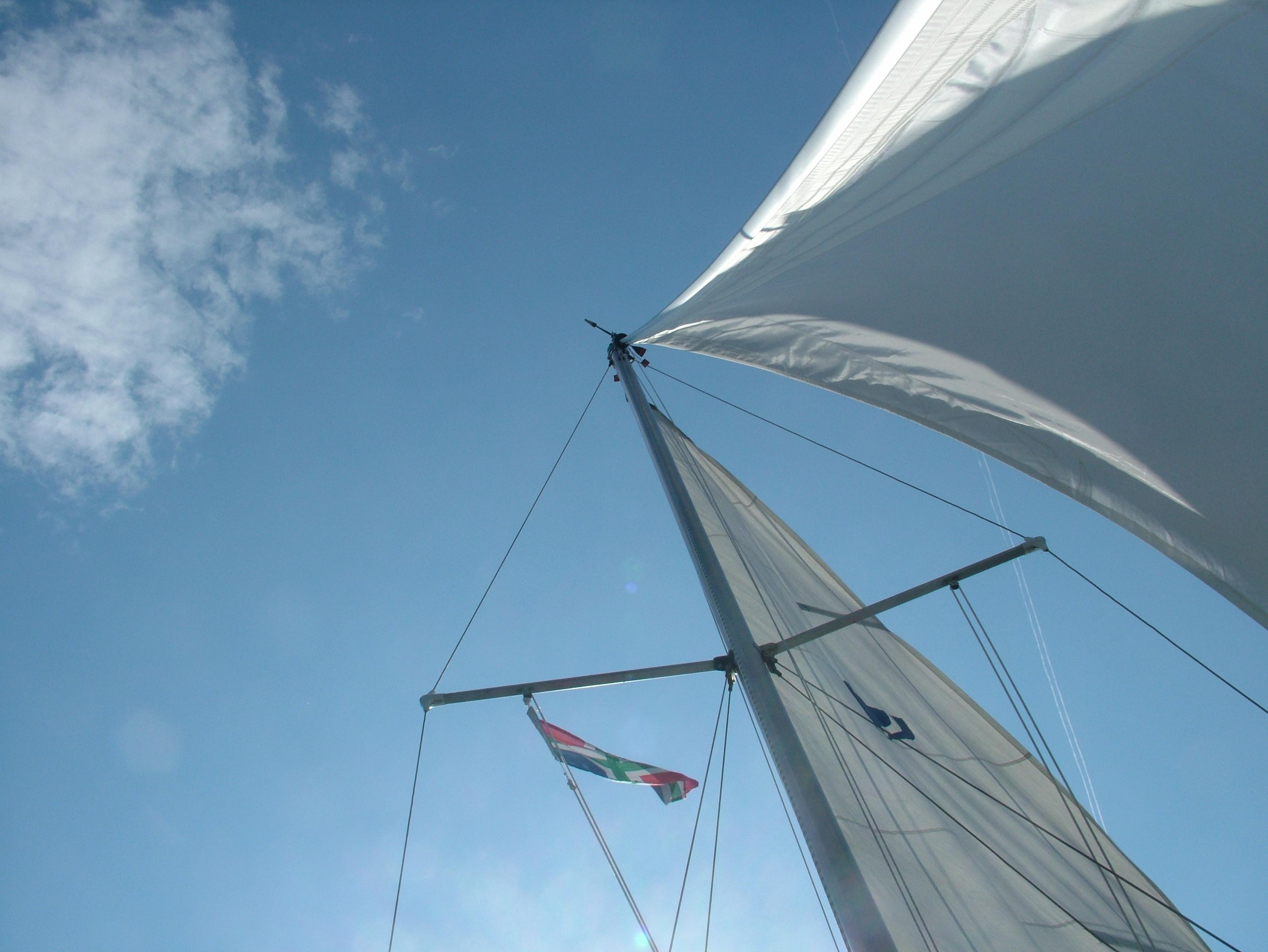
Typical tubular aluminum mast of a post-WWII era sailboat

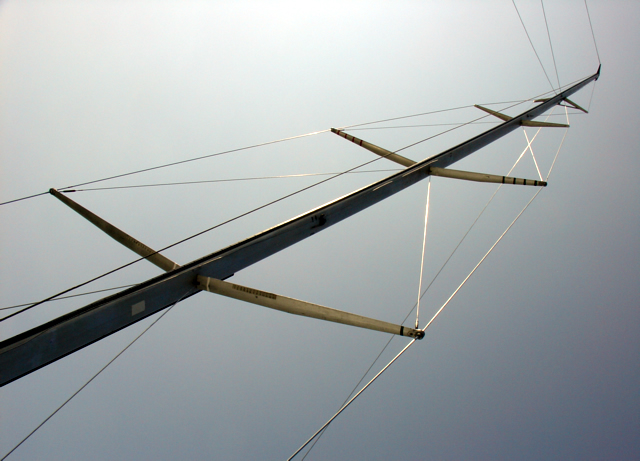
Mast of the sailing yacht Stars and Stripes, with shrouds held apart by multiple spreaders

Although sailing ships were superseded by engine-powered ships in the 19th century, recreational sailing ships and yachts continue to be designed and constructed.

In the 1930s aluminum masts were introduced on large J-class yachts. An aluminum mast has considerable advantages over a wooden one: it is lighter and slimmer than a wooden one of the same strength, is impervious to rot, and can be produced as a single extruded length. During the 1960s wood was eclipsed by aluminum. Aluminum alloys, generally 6000 series, are commonly utilised.

Recently some sailing yachts (particularly home-built yachts) have begun to use steel masts. Whilst somewhat heavier than aluminum, steel has its own set of advantages. It is significantly cheaper, and a steel mast of an equivalent strength can be smaller in diameter than an aluminum mast, allowing less turbulence and a better airflow onto the sail.

Illustration of modern mast and wing-mast cross-sections, with sail

From the mid-1990s racing yachts introduced the use of carbon fibre and other composite materials to construct masts with even better strength-to-weight ratios. Carbon fibre masts could also be constructed with more precisely engineered aerodynamic profiles.

Modern masts form the leading edge of a sail's airfoil and tend to have a teardrop-shaped cross-section. On smaller racing yachts and catamarans, the mast rotates to the optimum angle for the sail's airfoil. If the mast has a long, thin cross-section and makes up a significant area of the airfoil, it is called a wing-mast; boats using these have a smaller sail area to compensate for the larger mast area. There are many manufacturers of modern masts for sailing yachts of all sizes, a few notable companies are Hall Spars, Offshore Spars, and Southern Spars.

== Modern powerboat masts ==
After the end of the Age of Sail, steamships retained masts as ship to ship communications still relied on lights and signal flags, from commissioning pennants, house flags, to actual signals and courtesies. Warships also used them as observation posts for spotters, and to hold fire control equipment such as rangefinders.

As communication technology advanced, masts served as a convenient mounting location for radar and telecommunication antennas, which benefit from a higher mounting location to increase range. The masts themselves have also evolved from the bare pole of a simplified sailing mast to the enclosed masts on warships intended to reduce a ship's radar cross section, and in the arches and masts on merchant vessels and superyachts today.

The use of flags still serve an important part in both maritime protocols and by yacht racing officials, so many powerboats continue to incorporate masts in their design.

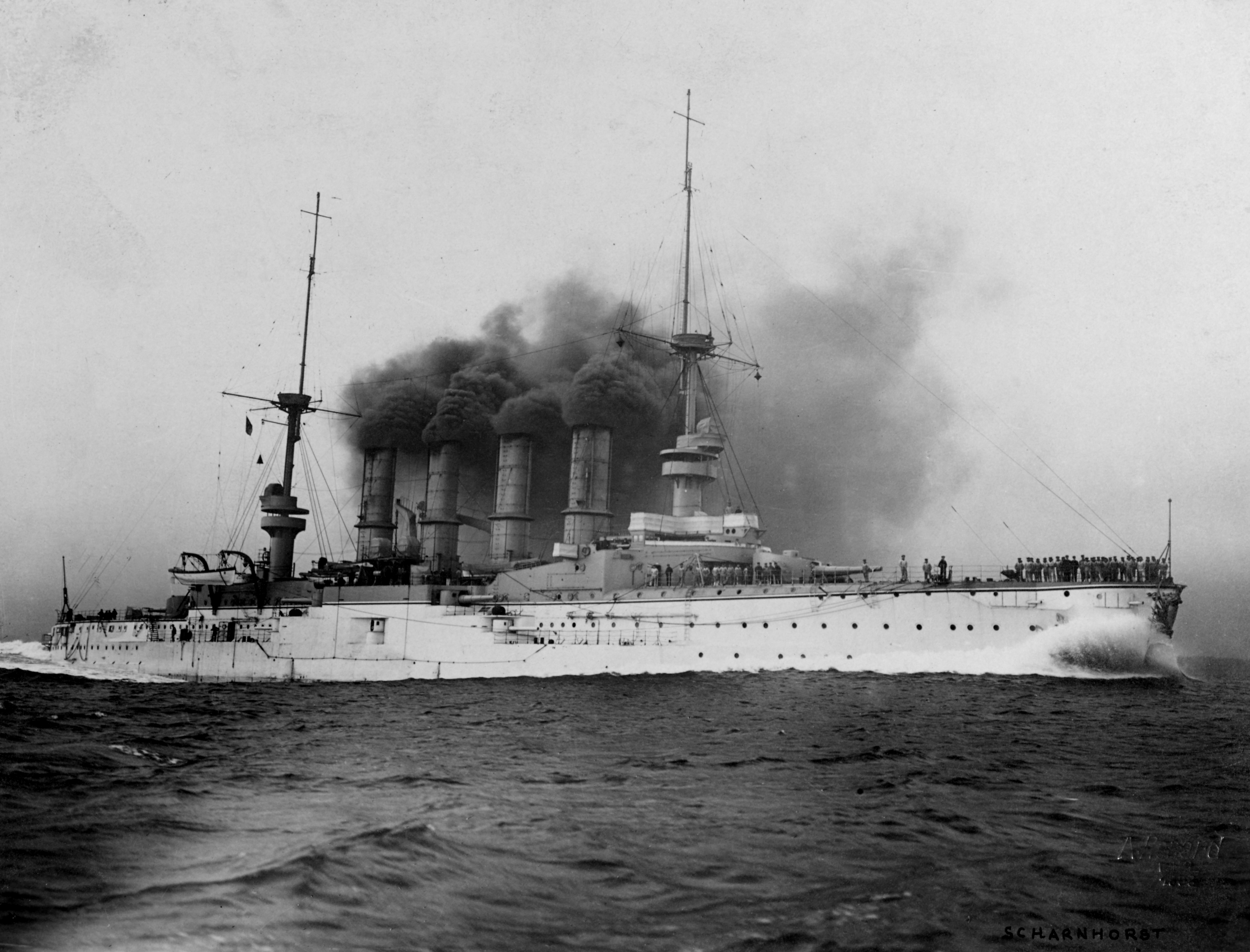
SMS Scharnhorst with pole masts

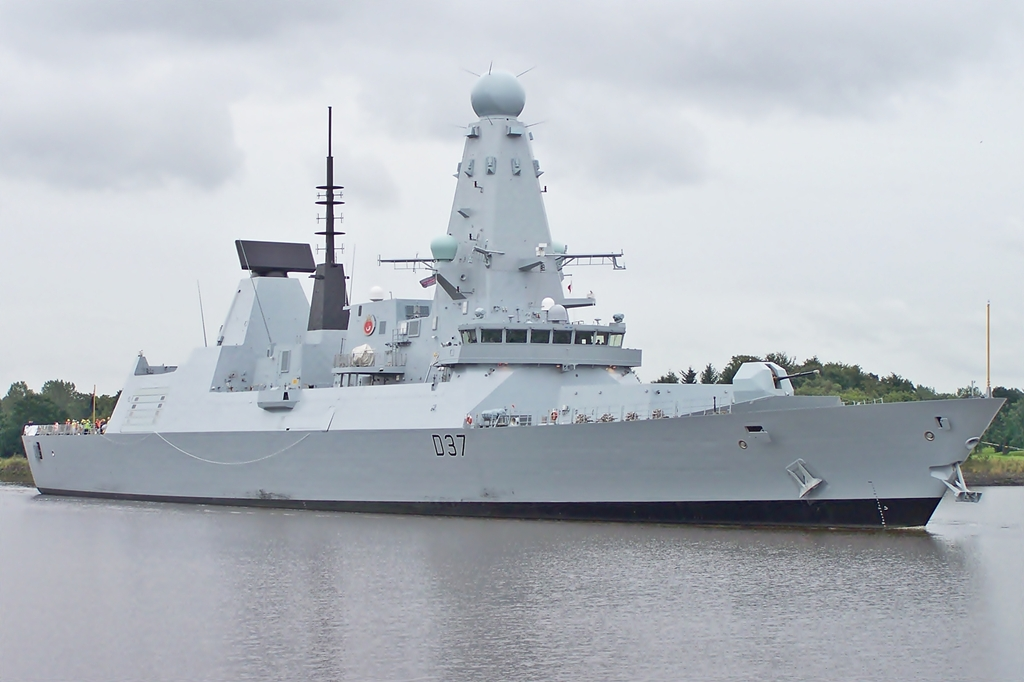
Modern enclosed mast of HMS Duncan

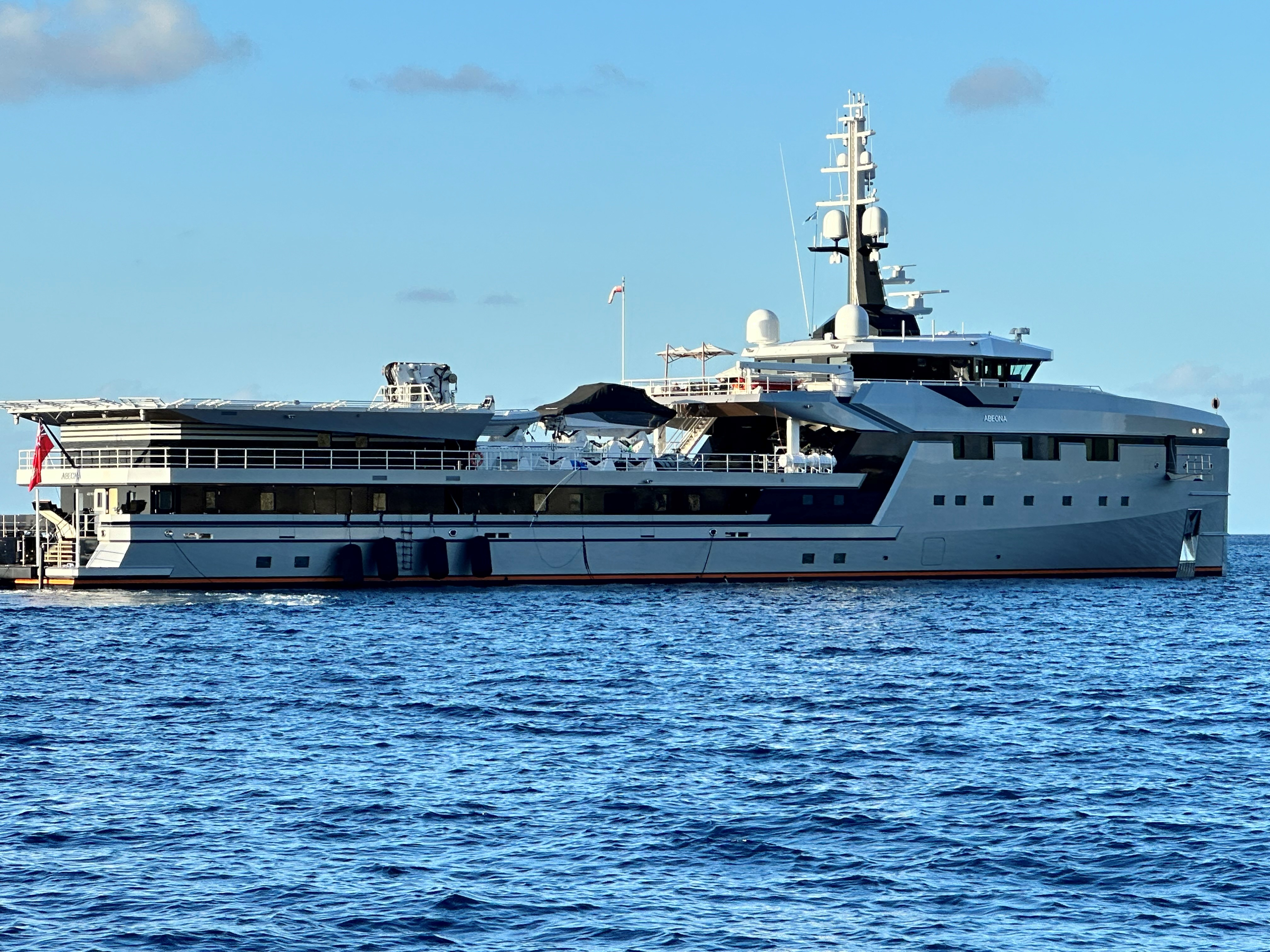
The mast of a modern superyacht

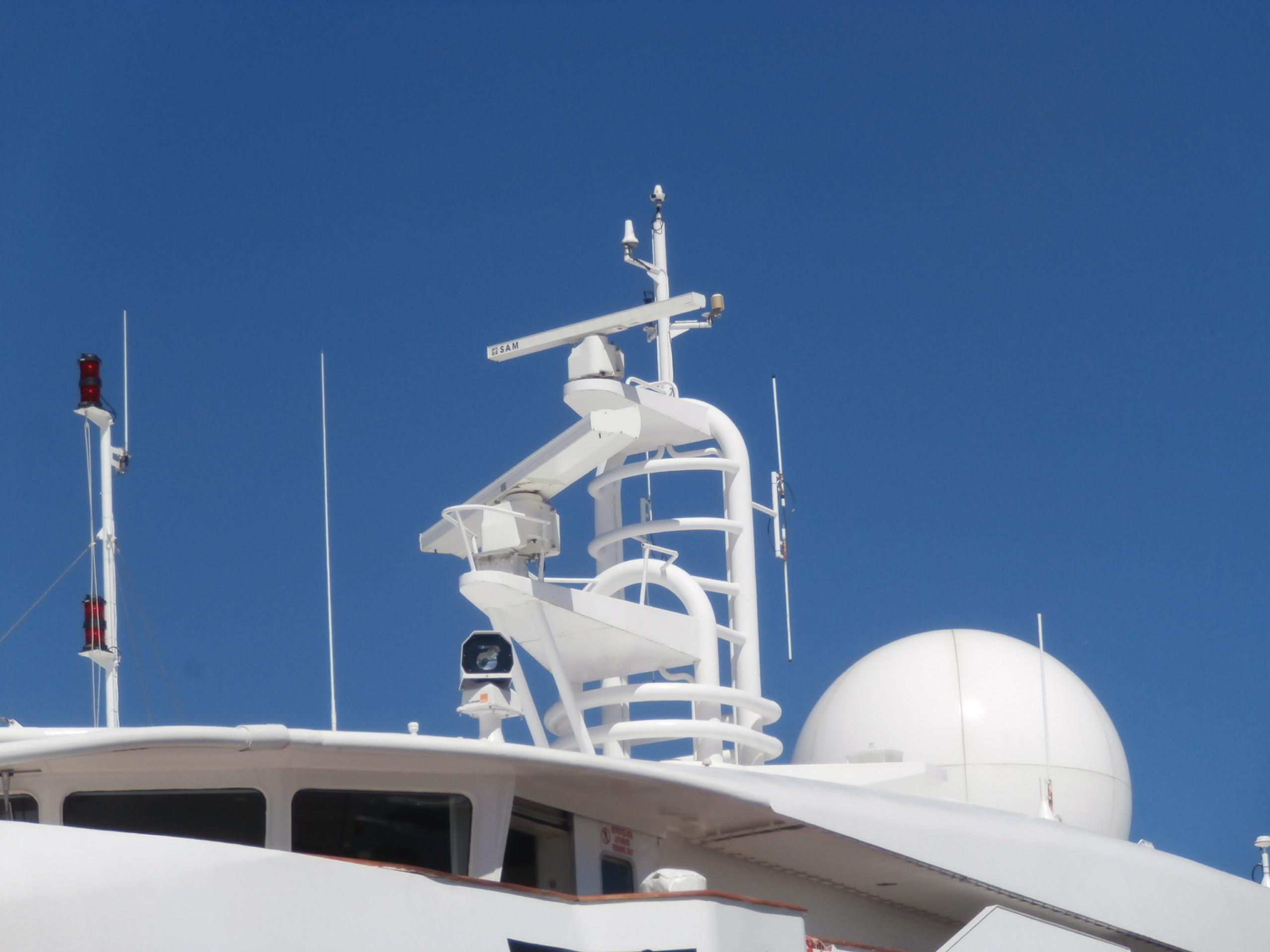
A yacht radar arch

== See also ==
- Dismasting
- Sail-plan
