= Jibboom =

Spar used on sailing ships

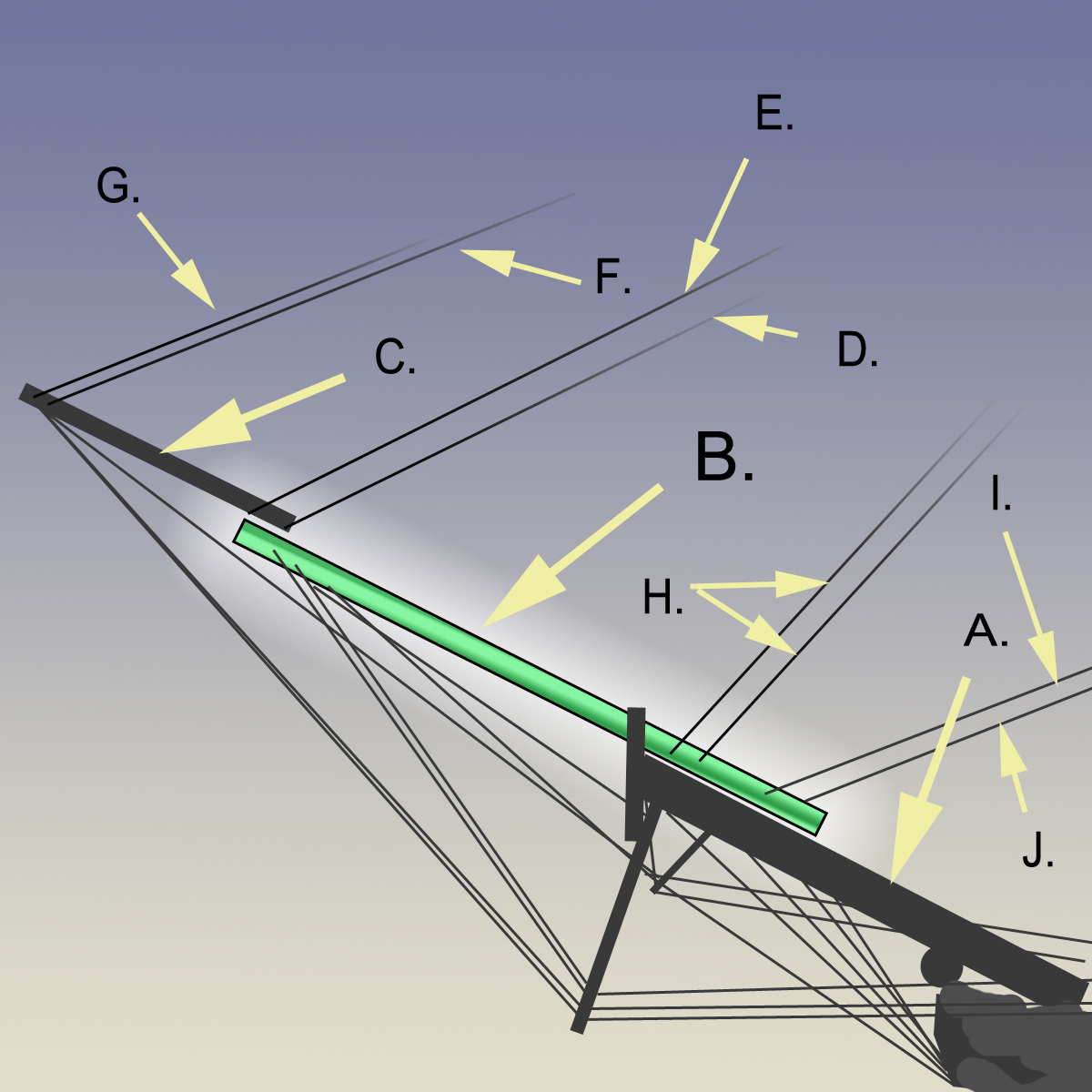
A diagram of the three spars and some of the rigging that can make up a bow: A.) Bowsprit, B.) Jibboom, C.) Flying jib-boom, D.) Jibstay. E.) Fore Topgallant Stay, F.) Flying Jibstay, G.) Fore Royal Stay, H.) Topmast stays, I.) Outer Forestay, J.) Inner Forestay

A jibboom (also spelled jib-boom) is a spar used to extend the length of a bowsprit on sailing ships. It can itself be extended further by a flying jib-boom. The heel (i.e. rear and lower) end of the flying jib-boom is attached to the jib-boom, and the heel of the jib-boom to the bowsprit. The point (i.e. higher and fore end) of the flying jib-boom is generally the fore-most extent of a ship. The jib- and flying jib- booms carry the tacks of the jib and flying jib sails, respectively, and the stay for the fore topgallant mast and the royal stay.

In yachts it is a boom attached to the foot of the jib, to keep the shape of the sail in different wind angles and to allow self tacking.

== Jib-boom ==
The jib-boom is—as the name suggests—the boom for the jib, extending its foot. On smaller, merchant, sailing ships, it is commonly attached to the bowsprit by a cap and a saddle, either lashed down or secured with a crupper chain. Alternatively, it can be attached by a boom iron and a cap, or even by two boom irons. The cap and saddle allow it to be withdrawn aft along the bowsprit as a ship enters harbour, reducing the opportunity for passing ships to glance against it and snap it off from the bowsprit.

It is octagonal in cross-section at its heel end. If secured by a chain to the bowsprit, it is iron-scored at the heel. At its point it is also (partly) octagonal in cross-section, the same as is the boom iron that secures the flying jib-boom to it. The flying jib-boom lies against the upper starboard side of the octagon.

The stay of the fore topgallant mast is attached to the jib-boom at the extremity of its point. The stay for the jib sail is attached to the shouldering at its heel. Just as the bowsprit has bobstays, in order to counteract the upward force from the jib and fore topgallant stays a martingale hangs down from the point of the jib-boom to a dolphin striker, pulling downwards on the jib-boom.

== Flying jib-boom ==
The flying jib-boom is secured, at its heel end, to the jib-boom by a boom iron and lashing. At its point, it has a sheave for the royal stay. Another sheave at the heel is for a heel rope. It is to the point that the tack of the flying jib sail is drawn out.
