= Bobstay =

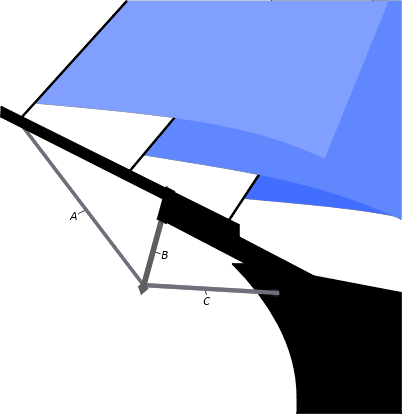
Schematic view of the bow of a ship, showing: A the martingale stay, B the dolphin striker and C the bobstay.

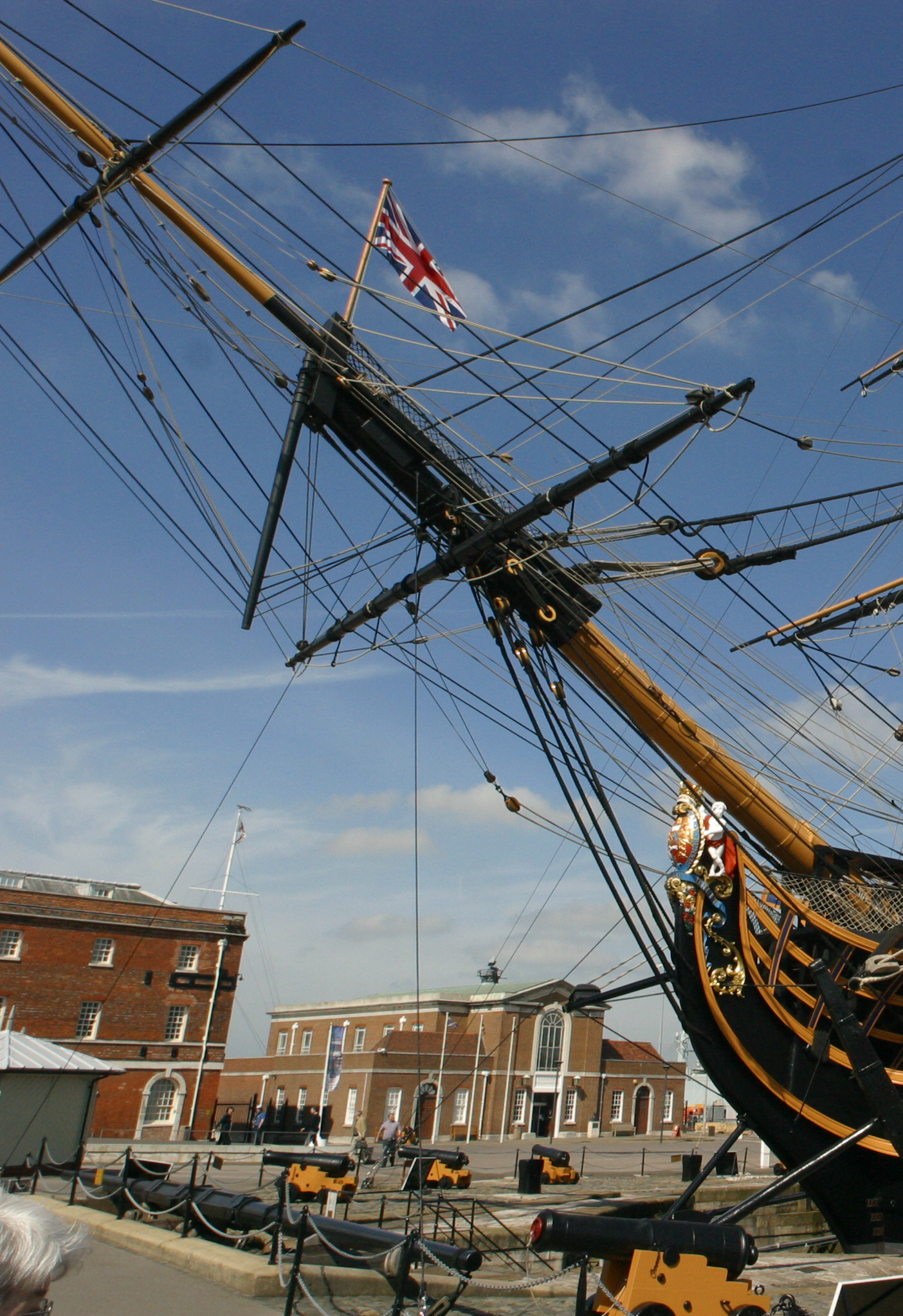
Bows of HMS Victory: three parallel bobstays, separate dolphin-striker with martingale stays.

A bobstay is a part of the rigging of a sailing boat or ship. Its purpose is to counteract the upward tension on the bowsprit from the jibs and forestay. A bobstay may run directly from the stem to the bowsprit, or it may run to a dolphin striker, a spar projecting downward, which is then held to the bowsprit or jibboom by a martingale stay.

== See also ==
- Bill Bobstay is a character in the operetta H.M.S. Pinafore (1878) by Gilbert and Sullivan.
- Bobstay was a 1977 detonation in the United States' Operation Cresset nuclear test series.
