= Operation Anvil (nuclear test) =

Series of 1970s US nuclear tests

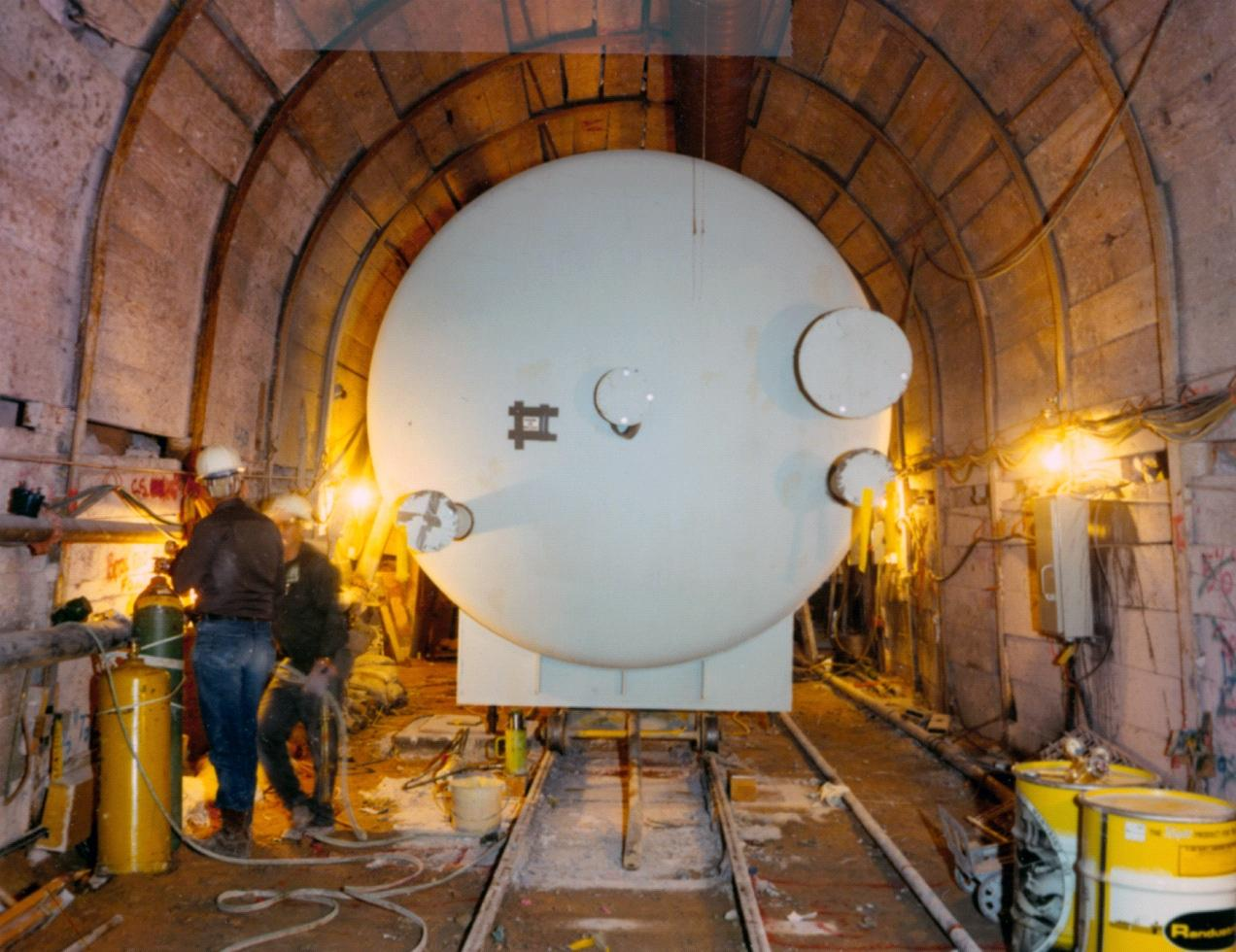
- Anvil Husky Pup test chamber 1.

Information
- Country: United States
- Test site: NTS Area 12, Rainier Mesa; NTS Area 19, 20, Pahute Mesa; NTS, Areas 1–4, 6–10, Yucca Flat
- Period: 1975–1976
- Number of tests: 21
- Test type: underground shaft, tunnel
- Max. yield: 1,200 kilotonnes of TNT (5,000 TJ)

Test series chronology

Operation Anvil was a series of 21 nuclear tests conducted by the United States in 1975–1976 at the Nevada Test Site. These tests followed the Operation Bedrock series and preceded the Operation Fulcrum series.

United States' Anvil series tests and detonations
Name (Note: The US, France and Great Britain have code-named their test events, while the USSR and China did not, and therefore have only test numbers (with some exceptions – Soviet peaceful explosions were named). Word translations into English in parentheses unless the name is a proper noun. A dash followed by a number indicates a member of a salvo event. The US also sometimes named the individual explosions in such a salvo test, which results in "name1 – 1(with name2)". If test is canceled or aborted, then the row data like date and location discloses the intended plans, where known.)	Date time (UT)	Local time zone (Note: To convert the UT time into standard local, add the number of hours in parentheses to the UT time; for local daylight saving time, add one additional hour. If the result is earlier than 00:00, add 24 hours and subtract 1 from the day; if it is 24:00 or later, subtract 24 hours and add 1 to the day. Historical time zone data obtained from the IANA time zone database.)	Location (Note: Rough place name and a latitude/longitude reference; for rocket-carried tests, the launch location is specified before the detonation location, if known. Some locations are extremely accurate; others (like airdrops and space blasts) may be quite inaccurate. "~" indicates a likely pro-forma rough location, shared with other tests in that same area.)	Elevation + height (Note: Elevation is the ground level at the point directly below the explosion relative to sea level; height is the additional distance added or subtracted by tower, balloon, shaft, tunnel, air drop or other contrivance. For rocket bursts the ground level is "N/A". In some cases it is not clear if the height is absolute or relative to ground, for example, Plumbbob/John. No number or units indicates the value is unknown, while "0" means zero. Sorting on this column is by elevation and height added together.)	Delivery (Note: Atmospheric, airdrop, balloon, gun, cruise missile, rocket, surface, tower, and barge are all disallowed by the Partial Nuclear Test Ban Treaty. Sealed shaft and tunnel are underground, and remained useful under the PTBT. Intentional cratering tests are borderline; they occurred under the treaty, were sometimes protested, and generally overlooked if the test was declared to be a peaceful use.) Purpose (Note: Include weapons development, weapon effects, safety test, transport safety test, war, science, joint verification and industrial/peaceful, which may be further broken down.)	Device (Note: Designations for test items where known, "?" indicates some uncertainty about the preceding value, nicknames for particular devices in quotes. This category of information is often not officially disclosed.)	Yield (Note: Estimated energy yield in tons, kilotons, and megatons. A ton of TNT equivalent is defined as 4.184 gigajoules (1 gigacalorie).)	Fallout (Note: Radioactive emission to the atmosphere aside from prompt neutrons, where known. The measured species is only iodine-131 if mentioned, otherwise it is all species. No entry means unknown, probably none if underground and "all" if not; otherwise notation for whether measured on the site only or off the site, where known, and the measured amount of radioactivity released.)	References	Notes
Marsh	September 6, 1975 17:00:00.113	PST (–8 hrs)	NTS Area U3kb 37.02362°N 116.02909°W	1,187 m (3,894 ft) – 427.21 m (1,401.6 ft)	underground shaft, weapons development		7 kt			
Peninsula (aborted)	October 23, 1975	PST (–8 hrs)	NTS Area near U2em	1,220 m (4,000 ft) +	underground shaft,		no yield			Became stuck in shaft while being lowered; abandoned, later destroyed by Tinderbox/Azul.
Husky Pup	October 24, 1975 17:11:26.093	PST (–8 hrs)	NTS Area U12t.03 37.22174°N 116.18019°W	2,036 m (6,680 ft) – 327.96 m (1,076.0 ft)	tunnel, weapon effect		15 kt			
Kasseri	October 28, 1975 14:30:00.16	PST (–8 hrs)	NTS Area U20z 37.29°N 116.41244°W	1,957 m (6,421 ft) – 1,264.92 m (4,150.0 ft)	underground shaft, weapons development	B77 Likely	1200 Kt	Venting detected		Likely Full yield test of the B77/B83
Deck	November 18, 1975 15:30:00.113	PST (–8 hrs)	NTS Area U3kd 37.02031°N 116.02143°W	1,185 m (3,888 ft) – 326.14 m (1,070.0 ft)	underground shaft, weapons development		5 kt			
Inlet	November 20, 1975 15:00:00.093	PST (–8 hrs)	NTS Area U19f 37.2249°N 116.36845°W	2,025 m (6,644 ft) – 818.33 m (2,684.8 ft)	underground shaft, weapons development		500 kt			
Leyden	November 26, 1975 15:30:00.163	PST (–8 hrs)	NTS Area U9cm 37.11721°N 116.01975°W	1,303 m (4,275 ft) – 326.11 m (1,069.9 ft)	underground shaft, weapons development		5 kt			
Chiberta	December 20, 1975 20:00:00.164	PST (–8 hrs)	NTS Area U2ek 37.1276°N 116.06244°W	1,264 m (4,147 ft) – 716 m (2,349 ft)	underground shaft, weapons development	B77	160 kt			
Muenster	January 3, 1976 19:15:00.162	PST (–8 hrs)	NTS Area U19e 37.2965°N 116.33407°W	2,082 m (6,831 ft) – 1,452.4 m (4,765 ft)	underground shaft, weapons development	B77/B83 Likely (reduced yield?)	800 kt			Likely B77 Components Tested
Keelson	February 4, 1976 14:20:00.112	PST (–8 hrs)	NTS Area U7ai 37.06921°N 116.03103°W	1,218 m (3,996 ft) – 639.62 m (2,098.5 ft)	underground shaft, weapons development		150 kt			
Esrom	February 4, 1976 14:40:00.163	PST (–8 hrs)	NTS Area U7ak 37.10655°N 116.03829°W	1,258 m (4,127 ft) – 654.6 m (2,148 ft)	underground shaft, weapons development	B77	160 kt	Venting detected, 88 Ci (3,300 GBq)		
Fontina	February 12, 1976 14:45:00.163	PST (–8 hrs)	NTS Area U20f 37.27136°N 116.48934°W	1,837 m (6,027 ft) – 1,219 m (3,999 ft)	underground shaft, weapons development	Likely B83	900 kt			
Cheshire	February 14, 1976 11:30:00.162	PST (–8 hrs)	NTS Area U20n 37.242611°N 116.42113°W	1,947 m (6,388 ft) – 1,167 m (3,829 ft)	underground shaft, weapons development	B77	350 kt			See Whetstone/Cambric. A test of groundwater mobility in moving buried radiaoactives, this time in volcanic rock/soil.
Shallows	February 26, 1976 14:50:00.091	PST (–8 hrs)	NTS Area U3jf 37.02851°N 116.01649°W	1,188 m (3,898 ft) – 244.85 m (803.3 ft)	underground shaft, weapons development		2.5 kt	Venting detected		
Estuary	March 9, 1976 14:00:00.094	PST (–8 hrs)	NTS Area U19g 37.30955°N 116.36549°W	2,025 m (6,644 ft) – 856.79 m (2,811.0 ft)	underground shaft, weapons development		350 kt			
Colby	March 14, 1976 12:30:00.163	PST (–8 hrs)	NTS Area U20aa 37.30594°N 116.47237°W	1,904 m (6,247 ft) – 1,273.4 m (4,178 ft)	underground shaft, weapons development	B77	800 kt	Venting detected, 44 Ci (1,600 GBq)		
Pool	March 17, 1976 14:15:00.09	PST (–8 hrs)	NTS Area U19p 37.25584°N 116.32946°W	2,076 m (6,811 ft) – 881.18 m (2,891.0 ft)	underground shaft, weapons development		500 kt			
Strait	March 17, 1976 14:45:00.091	PST (–8 hrs)	NTS Area U4a 37.10716°N 116.05432°W	1,243 m (4,078 ft) – 782.42 m (2,567.0 ft)	underground shaft, weapons development		210 kt			
Mighty Epic	May 12, 1976 19:50:00.17	PST (–8 hrs)	NTS Area U12n.10 37.20901°N 116.21333°W	2,224 m (7,297 ft) – 396.24 m (1,300.0 ft)	tunnel, weapon effect		20 kt			
Rivoli	May 20, 1976 17:30:00.162	PST (–8 hrs)	NTS Area U2eg 37.13715°N 116.06745°W	1,279 m (4,196 ft) – 199.64 m (655.0 ft)	underground shaft, weapons development	W79	600 t	Venting detected		
Billet	July 27, 1976 20:30:00.079	PST (–8 hrs)	NTS Area U7an 37.07537°N 116.04456°W	1,222 m (4,009 ft) – 636.57 m (2,088.5 ft)	underground shaft, weapons development	B61	58 kt	I-131 venting detected, 0		
