= Sprit topmast =

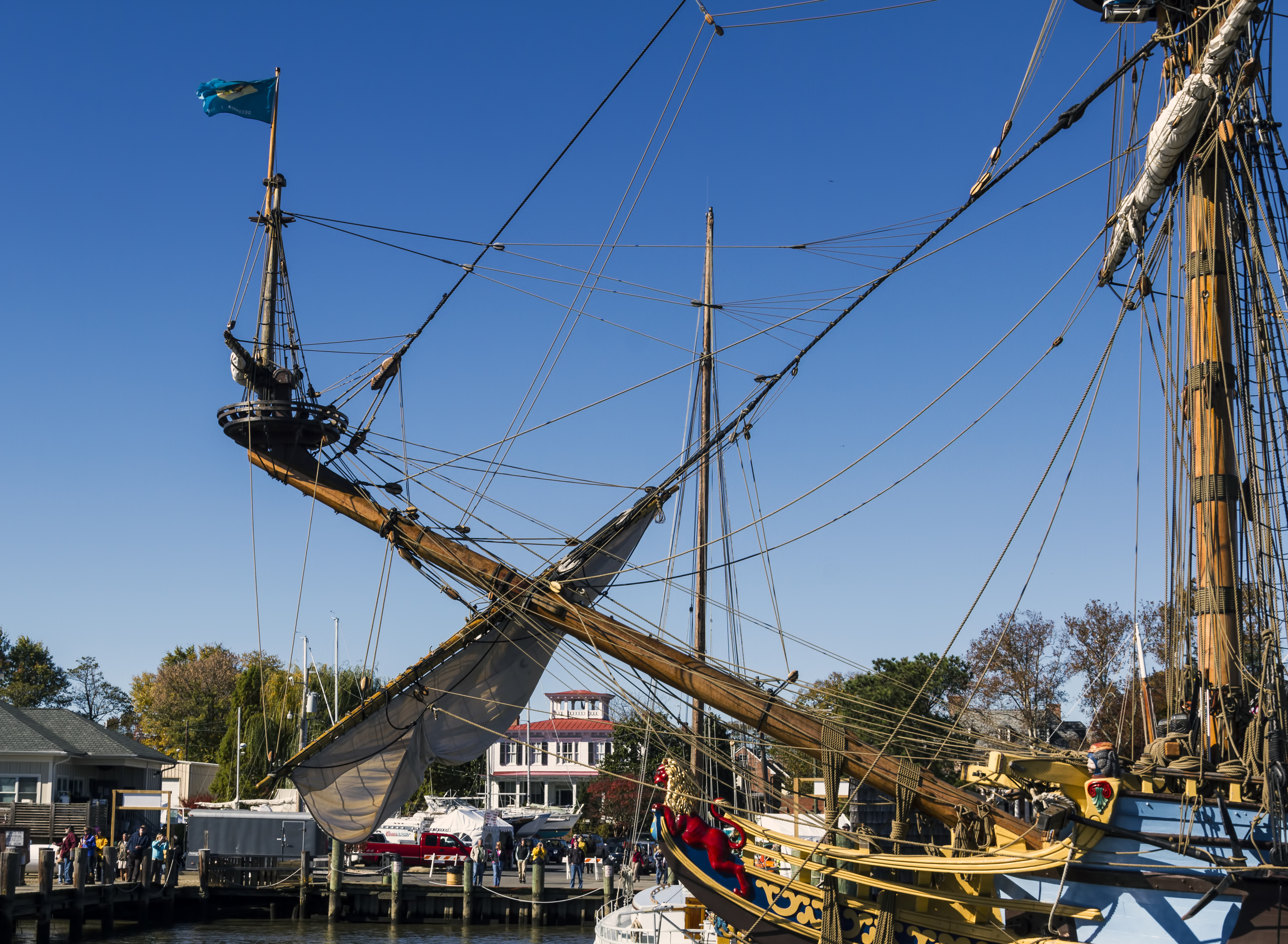
The replica ship Kalmar Nyckel's sprit topmast

A sprit topmast is a small topmast that was sometimes carried on the end of the bowsprit of a large European warship during the Age of Sail. Its purpose as initially built was to assist the spritsail (which hung below it) in bringing the bow around when tacking.

Unlike other topmasts, the sprit topmast, because of its odd angle, lacked a sheave. Instead, the short vertical pole (the mast proper) was secured to the bowsprit with a knee, and held a platform ("top") supported underneath by trestletrees and crosstrees and further secured to the bowsprit with a series of special chain plates. Above the platform ran a horizontal yard, the sprit topsail yard, from which a square square-rigged sail called the sprit topsail (the only sail on this mast) hung. Above this was a jackstaff. The mast was secured to the rear with a backstay that led to the foremast of the ship.

The hoisting and hauling the spritsail top sail had to be done by a man standing on the spritsail platform without the security of any safety net. That the hauling of the sail usually had to be done specifically as the weather was turning bad meant that the task was particularly dangerous. When the implementation of the jib sail necessitated the removal of this topmast, few would mourn its passing. By the middle of the eighteenth century shipbuilders began using jibs to do the same job as the spritsail topmast with greater efficiency and less risk to human life. The stays for the jib sails made the spritsail top both irrelevant and inconvenient. By 1720 it ceased to be incorporated into new ship designs. Its place was taken by the jibboom, and its function and stay were replaced with the dolphin striker stay.
