= Operation Arbor =

Series of 1970s US nuclear tests

Information
- Country: United States
- Test site: NTS Area 12, Rainier Mesa; NTS, Areas 1–4, 6–10, Yucca Flat
- Period: 1973–1974
- Number of tests: 18
- Test type: underground shaft, tunnel
- Max. yield: 150 kilotonnes of TNT (630 TJ)

Test series chronology

The United States's Arbor nuclear test series was a group of 18 nuclear tests conducted in 1973–1974. These tests (Note: A bomb test may be a salvo test, defined as two or more explosions "where a period of time between successive individual explosions does not exceed 5 seconds and where the burial points of all explosive devices can be connected by segments of straight lines, each of them connecting two burial points and does not exceed 40 kilometers in length".Mikhailov, V. N. "Catalog of World Wide Nuclear Testing". Begell-Atom. Archived from the original on April 26, 2014.) followed the Operation Toggle series and preceded the Operation Bedrock series.

United States' Arbor series tests and detonations
Name (Note: The US, France and Great Britain have code-named their test events, while the USSR and China did not, and therefore have only test numbers (with some exceptions – Soviet peaceful explosions were named). Word translations into English in parentheses unless the name is a proper noun. A dash followed by a number indicates a member of a salvo event. The US also sometimes named the individual explosions in such a salvo test, which results in "name1 – 1(with name2)". If test is canceled or aborted, then the row data like date and location discloses the intended plans, where known.)	Date time (UT)	Local time zone (Note: To convert the UT time into standard local, add the number of hours in parentheses to the UT time; for local daylight saving time, add one additional hour. If the result is earlier than 00:00, add 24 hours and subtract 1 from the day; if it is 24:00 or later, subtract 24 hours and add 1 to the day. Historical time zone data obtained from the IANA time zone database.)	Location (Note: Rough place name and a latitude/longitude reference; for rocket-carried tests, the launch location is specified before the detonation location, if known. Some locations are extremely accurate; others (like airdrops and space blasts) may be quite inaccurate. "~" indicates a likely pro-forma rough location, shared with other tests in that same area.)	Elevation + height (Note: Elevation is the ground level at the point directly below the explosion relative to sea level; height is the additional distance added or subtracted by tower, balloon, shaft, tunnel, air drop or other contrivance. For rocket bursts the ground level is "N/A". In some cases it is not clear if the height is absolute or relative to ground, for example, Plumbbob/John. No number or units indicates the value is unknown, while "0" means zero. Sorting on this column is by elevation and height added together.)	Delivery (Note: Atmospheric, airdrop, balloon, gun, cruise missile, rocket, surface, tower, and barge are all disallowed by the Partial Nuclear Test Ban Treaty. Sealed shaft and tunnel are underground, and remained useful under the PTBT. Intentional cratering tests are borderline; they occurred under the treaty, were sometimes protested, and generally overlooked if the test was declared to be a peaceful use.) Purpose (Note: Include weapons development, weapon effects, safety test, transport safety test, war, science, joint verification and industrial/peaceful, which may be further broken down.)	Device (Note: Designations for test items where known, "?" indicates some uncertainty about the preceding value, nicknames for particular devices in quotes. This category of information is often not officially disclosed.)	Yield (Note: Estimated energy yield in tons, kilotons, and megatons. A ton of TNT equivalent is defined as 4.184 gigajoules (1 gigacalorie).)	Fallout (Note: Radioactive emission to the atmosphere aside from prompt neutrons, where known. The measured species is only iodine-131 if mentioned, otherwise it is all species. No entry means unknown, probably none if underground and "all" if not; otherwise notation for whether measured on the site only or off the site, where known, and the measured amount of radioactivity released.)	References	Notes
Polygonum	October 2, 1973 14:30:00.166	PST (–8 hrs)	NTS Area U2by 37.15903°N 116.07413°W	1,304 m (4,278 ft) – 213.36 m (700.0 ft)	underground shaft, weapons development		less than 20 kt			
Waller	October 2, 1973 15:15:00.164	PST (–8 hrs)	NTS Area U2bz 37.15386°N 116.06858°W	1,294 m (4,245 ft) – 310.9 m (1,020 ft)	underground shaft, weapons development		1 kt	Venting detected, 3 Ci (110 GBq)		
Husky Ace	October 12, 1973 17:00:00.08	PST (–8 hrs)	NTS Area U12n.07 37.20034°N 116.20404°W	2,238 m (7,343 ft) – 415.66 m (1,363.7 ft)	tunnel, weapon effect		8 kt			
Bernal	November 28, 1973 15:30:00.08	PST (–8 hrs)	NTS Area U3jy 37.01097°N 116.02523°W	1,183 m (3,881 ft) – 285.29 m (936.0 ft)	underground shaft, weapons development		5 kt	Venting detected, 0.1 Ci (3.7 GBq)		
Pajara	December 12, 1973 19:00:00.1	PST (–8 hrs)	NTS Area U3ji 36.99148°N 116.0251°W	1,175 m (3,855 ft) – 278.17 m (912.6 ft)	underground shaft, weapons development		5 kt	Venting detected, 5 Ci (180 GBq)		
Seafoam	December 13, 1973 15:17:00.17	PST (–8 hrs)	NTS Area U2ea 37.16135°N 116.07392°W	1,306 m (4,285 ft) – 198.12 m (650.0 ft)	underground shaft, weapons development		less than 20 kt	Venting detected, 5 Ci (180 GBq)		
Spar	December 19, 1973 18:30:00.04	PST (–8 hrs)	NTS Area U3jr 37.00575°N 116.01964°W	1,180 m (3,870 ft) – 148.43 m (487.0 ft)	underground shaft, safety experiment		less than 20 kt			
Elida	December 19, 1973 19:16:00.11	PST (–8 hrs)	NTS Area U3hy 37.00109°N 116.03228°W	1,178 m (3,865 ft) – 381.42 m (1,251.4 ft)	underground shaft, weapons development		300 t	Venting detected, 0.8 Ci (30 GBq)		
Pinedrops-Bayou - 2	January 10, 1974 15:38:00.17	PST (–8 hrs)	NTS Area U10as 37.17407°N 116.05167°W	1,283 m (4,209 ft) – 343 m (1,125 ft)	underground shaft, weapons development		less than 5 kt	Venting detected, 6 Ci (220 GBq)		Simultaneous, same hole.
Pinedrops-Sloat - 1	January 10, 1974 15:38:00.17	PST (–8 hrs)	NTS Area U10as 37.17407°N 116.05167°W	1,283 m (4,209 ft) – 342.9 m (1,125 ft)	underground shaft, weapons development		less than 5 kt			Simultaneous, same hole.
Pinedrops-Tawny - 3	January 10, 1974 15:38:00.17	PST (–8 hrs)	NTS Area U10as 37.17407°N 116.05167°W	1,283 m (4,209 ft) +	underground shaft, weapons development		less than 5 kt			Simultaneous, same hole.
Latir	February 27, 1974 17:00:00.09	PST (–8 hrs)	NTS Area U4d 37.1044°N 116.05396°W	1,243 m (4,078 ft) – 640.77 m (2,102.3 ft)	underground shaft, weapons development		150 kt			
Hulsea	March 14, 1974 17:00:00.166	PST (–8 hrs)	NTS Area U2bx 37.15508°N 116.06497°W	1,289 m (4,229 ft) – 195.07 m (640.0 ft)	underground shaft, weapons development		less than 20 kt	Venting detected, 67 Ci (2,500 GBq)		
Sapello	April 12, 1974 15:15:00.08	PST (–8 hrs)	NTS Area U3ge 37.01489°N 116.04501°W	1,189 m (3,901 ft) – 180.74 m (593.0 ft)	underground shaft, weapons development		less than 20 kt			
Potrero	April 23, 1974 15:13:00.161	PST (–8 hrs)	NTS Area U2eb 37.15999°N 116.07736°W	1,310 m (4,300 ft) – 210.31 m (690.0 ft)	underground shaft, weapons development		500 t			
Plomo	May 1, 1974 14:02:00.21	PST (–8 hrs)	NTS Area U3ff 37.03109°N 115.98633°W	1,227 m (4,026 ft) – 149.35 m (490.0 ft)	underground shaft, weapons development		less than 20 kt			
Jib	May 8, 1974 16:55:00.085	PST (–8 hrs)	NTS Area U3hb 37.00095°N 116.00234°W	1,177 m (3,862 ft) – 180.44 m (592.0 ft)	underground shaft, weapons development		less than 20 kt			
Grove	May 22, 1974 14:15:00.169	PST (–8 hrs)	NTS Area U2ds 37.11486°N 116.07544°W	1,264 m (4,147 ft) – 313.94 m (1,030.0 ft)	underground shaft, weapons development		2.5 kt	Venting detected, 26 Ci (960 GBq)		
Jara	June 6, 1974 14:40:00.08	PST (–8 hrs)	NTS Area U3hp 37.00383°N 116.02426°W	1,180 m (3,870 ft) – 378.06 m (1,240.4 ft)	underground shaft, weapons development		4 kt	Venting detected		
Ming Blade	June 19, 1974 16:00:00.084	PST (–8 hrs)	NTS Area U12n.08 37.21026°N 116.20813°W	2,212 m (7,257 ft) – 387.65 m (1,271.8 ft)	tunnel, weapon effect		20 kt			
