= Operation Toggle =

Series of 1970s US nuclear tests

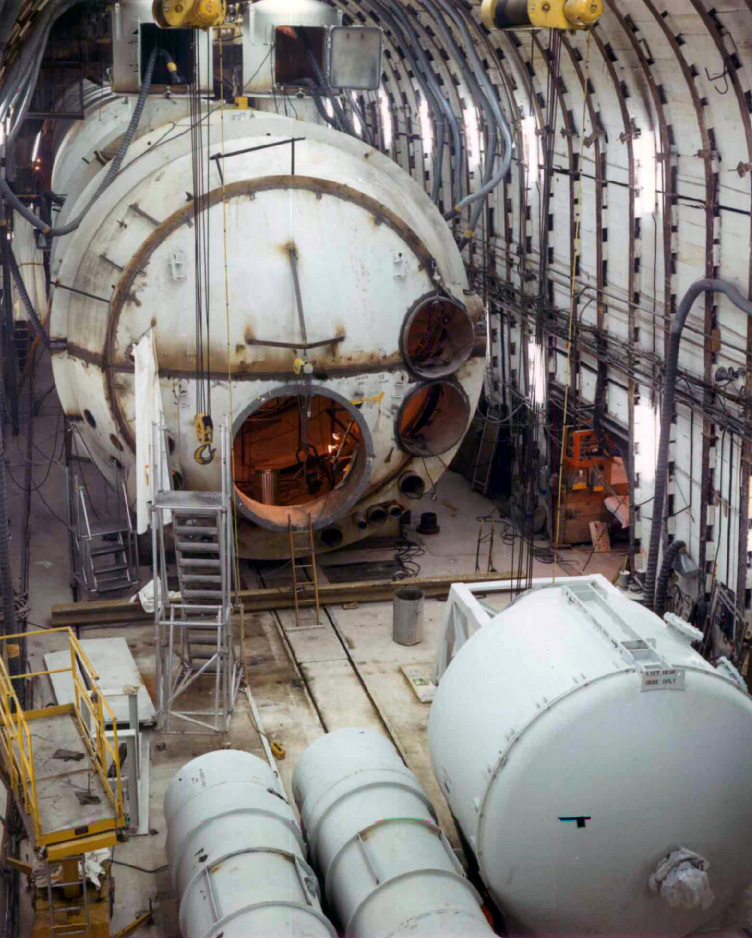
- Toggle Diamond Sculls tunnel test chamber

Information
- Country: United States
- Test site: near Rifle, Colorado; NTS Area 12, Rainier Mesa; NTS Area 19, 20, Pahute Mesa; NTS, Areas 1–4, 6–10, Yucca Flat
- Period: 1972–1973
- Number of tests: 28
- Test type: underground shaft, tunnel
- Max. yield: 250 kilotonnes of TNT (1,000 TJ)

Test series chronology

The United States's Toggle nuclear test series was a group of 28 nuclear tests conducted in 1972–1973. These tests (Note: A bomb test may be a salvo test, defined as two or more explosions "where a period of time between successive individual explosions does not exceed 5 seconds and where the burial points of all explosive devices can be connected by segments of straight lines, each of them connecting two burial points and does not exceed 40 kilometers in length". Mikhailov, V. N. "Catalog of World Wide Nuclear Testing". Begell-Atom. Archived from the original on April 26, 2014.) followed the Operation Grommet series and preceded the Operation Arbor series.

== Shots ==
=== Diamond Sculls ===
Diamond Sculls was a horizontal line-of-sight (HLOS) nuclear test. Its purpose was to test the radiation hardness of the LIM-49 Spartan anti-ballistic missile. It was the largest HLOS test conducted by the United States, consisting of a 27-foot (8.2 m) diameter test chamber and a 1,900-foot (580 m) line-of-sight pipe.

== List of the nuclear tests ==
United States' Toggle series tests and detonations
| Name (Note: The US, France and Great Britain have code-named their test events, while the USSR and China did not, and therefore have only test numbers (with some exceptions – Soviet peaceful explosions were named). Word translations into English in parentheses unless the name is a proper noun. A dash followed by a number indicates a member of a salvo event. The US also sometimes named the individual explosions in such a salvo test, which results in "name1 – 1(with name2)". If test is canceled or aborted, then the row data like date and location discloses the intended plans, where known.) | Date time (UT) | Local time zone (Note: To convert the UT time into standard local, add the number of hours in parentheses to the UT time; for local daylight saving time, add one additional hour. If the result is earlier than 00:00, add 24 hours and subtract 1 from the day; if it is 24:00 or later, subtract 24 hours and add 1 to the day. Historical time zone data obtained from the IANA time zone database.) | Location (Note: Rough place name and a latitude/longitude reference; for rocket-carried tests, the launch location is specified before the detonation location, if known. Some locations are extremely accurate; others (like airdrops and space blasts) may be quite inaccurate. "~" indicates a likely pro-forma rough location, shared with other tests in that same area.) | Elevation + height (Note: Elevation is the ground level at the point directly below the explosion relative to sea level; height is the additional distance added or subtracted by tower, balloon, shaft, tunnel, air drop or other contrivance. For rocket bursts the ground level is "N/A". In some cases it is not clear if the height is absolute or relative to ground, for example, Plumbbob/John. No number or units indicates the value is unknown, while "0" means zero. Sorting on this column is by elevation and height added together.) | Delivery (Note: Atmospheric, airdrop, balloon, gun, cruise missile, rocket, surface, tower, and barge are all disallowed by the Partial Nuclear Test Ban Treaty. Sealed shaft and tunnel are underground, and remained useful under the PTBT. Intentional cratering tests are borderline; they occurred under the treaty, were sometimes protested, and generally overlooked if the test was declared to be a peaceful use.) Purpose (Note: Include weapons development, weapon effects, safety test, transport safety test, war, science, joint verification and industrial/peaceful, which may be further broken down.) | Device (Note: Designations for test items where known, "?" indicates some uncertainty about the preceding value, nicknames for particular devices in quotes. This category of information is often not officially disclosed.) | Yield (Note: Estimated energy yield in tons, kilotons, and megatons. A ton of TNT equivalent is defined as 4.184 gigajoules (1 gigacalorie).) | Fallout (Note: Radioactive emission to the atmosphere aside from prompt neutrons, where known. The measured species is only iodine-131 if mentioned, otherwise it is all species. No entry means unknown, probably none if underground and "all" if not; otherwise notation for whether measured on the site only or off the site, where known, and the measured amount of radioactivity released.) | References | Notes |
|---|---|---|---|---|---|---|---|---|---|---|
| Diamond Sculls | July 20, 1972 17:16:00.16 | PST (–8 hrs) | NTS Area U12t.02 37.21439°N 116.18382°W | 2,113 m (6,932 ft) – 419.4 m (1,376 ft) | tunnel, weapon effect | | 21 kt | | | Spartan missile hardness test. |
| Atarque | July 25, 1972 13:30:00.06 | PST (–8 hrs) | NTS Area U3ht 37.01247°N 116.01577°W | 1,182 m (3,878 ft) – 294.2 m (965 ft) | underground shaft, weapons development | | 1.5 kt | Venting detected | | |
| Cebolla – 1 (with Cuchillo, Solano) | August 9, 1972 13:31:10.04 | PST (–8 hrs) | NTS Area U3jc 37.00717°N 116.01976°W | 1,180 m (3,870 ft) – 287 m (942 ft) | underground shaft, weapons development | | less than 5 kt | Venting detected | | Simultaneous, separate holes. |
| Cuchillo – 2 (with Cebolla, Solano) | August 9, 1972 13:31:10.04 | PST (–8 hrs) | NTS Area U3jt 37.00373°N 116.01982°W | 1,179 m (3,868 ft) – 198.81 m (652.3 ft) | underground shaft, weapons development | | less than 5 kt | | | Simultaneous, separate holes. |
| Solano – 3 (with Cebolla, Cuchillo | August 9, 1972 13:31:10.04 | PST (–8 hrs) | NTS Area U3jx 37.00315°N 116.01757°W | 1,179 m (3,868 ft) + | underground shaft, safety experiment | | less than 5 kt | | | Simultaneous, separate holes. |
| Oscuro | September 21, 1972 15:30:00.19 | PST (–8 hrs) | NTS Area U7z 37.08201°N 116.03742°W | 1,225 m (4,019 ft) – 560.21 m (1,838.0 ft) | underground shaft, weapons development | | 160 kt | | | |
| Delphinium | September 26, 1972 14:30:00.16 | PST (–8 hrs) | NTS Area U2dp 37.12135°N 116.08667°W | 1,276 m (4,186 ft) – 295.66 m (970.0 ft) | underground shaft, weapons development | | 15 kt | | | |
| Akbar | November 9, 1972 15:15:00.16 | PST (–8 hrs) | NTS Area U10ax 37.16202°N 116.03405°W | 1,295 m (4,249 ft) – 267 m (876 ft) | underground shaft, weapons development | | 600 t | | | |
| Arsenate | November 9, 1972 18:15:00.16 | PST (–8 hrs) | NTS Area U9ci 37.12151°N 116.03326°W | 1,268 m (4,160 ft) – 250.24 m (821.0 ft) | underground shaft, weapons development | | 600 t | Venting detected, 12 Ci (440 GBq) | | |
| Canna-Limoges – 2 | November 17, 1972 18:00:00.16 | PST (–8 hrs) | NTS Area U9itsyz26 37.13953°N 116.03324°W | 1,273 m (4,177 ft) + | underground shaft, safety experiment | | less than 20 kt | | | Simultaneous, same hole. |
| Canna-Umbrinus – 1 | November 17, 1972 18:00:00.16 | PST (–8 hrs) | NTS Area U9itsyz2 37.13953°N 116.03324°W | 1,273 m (4,177 ft) – 213.36 m (700.0 ft) | underground shaft, weapons development | | less than 20 kt | | | Simultaneous, same hole. |
| Tuloso | December 12, 1972 16:30:00.04 | PST (–8 hrs) | NTS Area U3gi 37.03128°N 116.02196°W | 1,189 m (3,901 ft) – 271.09 m (889.4 ft) | underground shaft, weapons development | | 200 t | | | |
| Solanum | December 14, 1972 15:30:00.16 | PST (–8 hrs) | NTS Area U9itsw24 37.13804°N 116.03559°W | 1,267 m (4,157 ft) – 201.17 m (660.0 ft) | underground shaft, weapons development | | less than 20 kt | Venting detected | | |
| Flax-Source | December 21, 1972 20:15:00.24 | PST (–8 hrs) | NTS Area U2dj 37.13997°N 116.08415°W | 1,296 m (4,252 ft) – 440 m (1,440 ft) | underground shaft, weapons development | | 20 kt | | | |
| Flax-Backup – 2 | December 21, 1972 20:15:24.35 | PST (–8 hrs) | NTS Area U2dj 37.13997°N 116.08415°W | 1,296 m (4,252 ft) + | underground shaft, weapon effect | | less than 20 kt | | | |
| Flax-Test – 1 | December 21, 1972 20:15:24.35 | PST (–8 hrs) | NTS Area U2dj 37.13997°N 116.08415°W | 1,296 m (4,252 ft) – 688.85 m (2,260.0 ft) | underground shaft, weapon effect | | 20 kt | | | |
| Alumroot | February 14, 1973 15:30:00.16 | PST (–8 hrs) | NTS Area U9cj 37.14704°N 116.05096°W | 1,264 m (4,147 ft) – 182.88 m (600.0 ft) | underground shaft, weapons development | | less than 20 kt | | | |
| Miera | March 8, 1973 16:10:00.19 | PST (–8 hrs) | NTS Area U7ad 37.10354°N 116.02759°W | 1,279 m (4,196 ft) – 568.39 m (1,864.8 ft) | underground shaft, weapons development | | 67 kt | I-131 venting detected, 0 | | |
| Gazook | March 23, 1973 20:15:00.17 | PST (–8 hrs) | NTS Area U2do 37.11727°N 116.08779°W | 1,274 m (4,180 ft) – 326.14 m (1,070.0 ft) | underground shaft, weapons development | | 200 t | Venting detected, 12 Ci (440 GBq) | | |
| Natoma | April 5, 1973 14:50:00.16 | PST (–8 hrs) | NTS Area U10aw 37.17783°N 116.05476°W | 1,283 m (4,209 ft) – 243.84 m (800.0 ft) | underground shaft, weapons development | | less than 20 kt | | | |
| Angus – 1 (with Velarde) | April 25, 1973 22:25:00.03 | PST (–8 hrs) | NTS Area U3jg 37.00483°N 116.0292°W | 1,180 m (3,870 ft) – 452.63 m (1,485.0 ft) | underground shaft, weapons development | | 9 kt | Venting detected, 0.6 Ci (22 GBq) | | Simultaneous, separate holes. |
| Velarde – 2 (with Angus) | April 25, 1973 22:25:00.07 | PST (–8 hrs) | NTS Area U3jk 36.99367°N 116.02173°W | 1,176 m (3,858 ft) – 277 m (909 ft) | underground shaft, weapons development | | 8 kt | Venting detected, 250 Ci (9,200 GBq) | | Simultaneous, separate holes. |
| Colmor | April 26, 1973 15:15:00.04 | PST (–8 hrs) | NTS Area U3hv 37.01214°N 116.0207°W | 1,182 m (3,878 ft) – 245.81 m (806.5 ft) | underground shaft, weapons development | | 500 t | Venting detected | | |
| Starwort | April 26, 1973 17:15:00.16 | PST (–8 hrs) | NTS Area U2bs 37.12301°N 116.05937°W | 1,261 m (4,137 ft) – 563.88 m (1,850.0 ft) | underground shaft, weapons development | | 90 kt | Venting detected, 10 Ci (370 GBq) | | |
| Mesita | May 9, 1973 13:30:00.04 | PST (–8 hrs) | NTS Area U3jd 37.00626°N 116.01681°W | 1,180 m (3,870 ft) – 149.25 m (489.7 ft) | underground shaft, weapons development | | less than 20 kt | Venting detected | | |
| Rio Blanco – 1 | May 17, 1973 16:00:00.12 | MST (–7 hrs) | near Rifle, Colorado 39.79322°N 108.3672°W | 1,938 m (6,358 ft) – 1,758 m (5,768 ft) | underground shaft, peaceful research | | 33 kt | | | Operation Plowshare – AEC/Gas industry enhancement experiment. Simultaneous, same hole. |
| Rio Blanco – 2 | May 17, 1973 16:00:00.12 | MST (–7 hrs) | near Rifle, Colorado 39.79322°N 108.3672°W | 1,938 m (6,358 ft) – 1,875 m (6,152 ft) | underground shaft, peaceful research | | 33 kt | | | Project Plowshare – AEC/Gas industry enhancement experiment. Simultaneous, same hole. |
| Rio Blanco – 3 | May 17, 1973 16:00:00.12 | MST (–7 hrs) | near Rifle, Colorado 39.79322°N 108.3672°W | 1,938 m (6,358 ft) – 2,015 m (6,611 ft) | underground shaft, peaceful research | | 33 kt | | | Project Plowshare – AEC/Gas industry enhancement experiment. Simultaneous, same hole. |
| Cabresto | May 24, 1973 13:30:00.04 | PST (–8 hrs) | NTS Area U7h 37.078°N 116.03164°W | 1,228 m (4,029 ft) – 197.89 m (649.2 ft) | underground shaft, weapons development | | 15 kt | | | |
| Kashan | May 24, 1973 14:30:00.16 | PST (–8 hrs) | NTS Area U10av 37.16222°N 116.05689°W | 1,277 m (4,190 ft) – 265.18 m (870.0 ft) | underground shaft, weapons development | | 2 kt | Venting detected, 270 Ci (10,000 GBq) | | |
| Dido Queen | June 5, 1973 17:00:00.17 | PST (–8 hrs) | NTS Area U12e.14 37.18498°N 116.21599°W | 2,247 m (7,372 ft) – 391.36 m (1,284.0 ft) | tunnel, weapon effect | | 18 kt | | | |
| Almendro | June 6, 1973 13:00:00.08 | PST (–8 hrs) | NTS Area U19v – 37.245°N 116.34691°W | 2,069 m (6,788 ft) – 1,066.52 m (3,499.1 ft) | underground shaft, weapons development | W87 | 250 kt | | | |
| Potrillo | June 21, 1973 14:45:00.08 | PST (–8 hrs) | NTS Area U7af 37.09199°N 116.02809°W | 1,255 m (4,117 ft) – 567.02 m (1,860.3 ft) | underground shaft, weapons development | | 58 kt | Venting detected | | |
| Portulaca | June 28, 1973 19:15:12.4 | PST (–8 hrs) | NTS Area U2bv 37.14837°N 116.08673°W | 1,311 m (4,301 ft) – 466.34 m (1,530.0 ft) | underground shaft, weapons development | | 24 kt | I-131 venting detected, 0 | | |
| Silene | June 28, 1973 19:45:00.16 | PST (–8 hrs) | NTS Area U9ck 37.11486°N 116.04179°W | 1,254 m (4,114 ft) – 198.12 m (650.0 ft) | underground shaft, weapons development | | 5 t | | | |
