= Project Rio Blanco =

1973 underground nuclear test

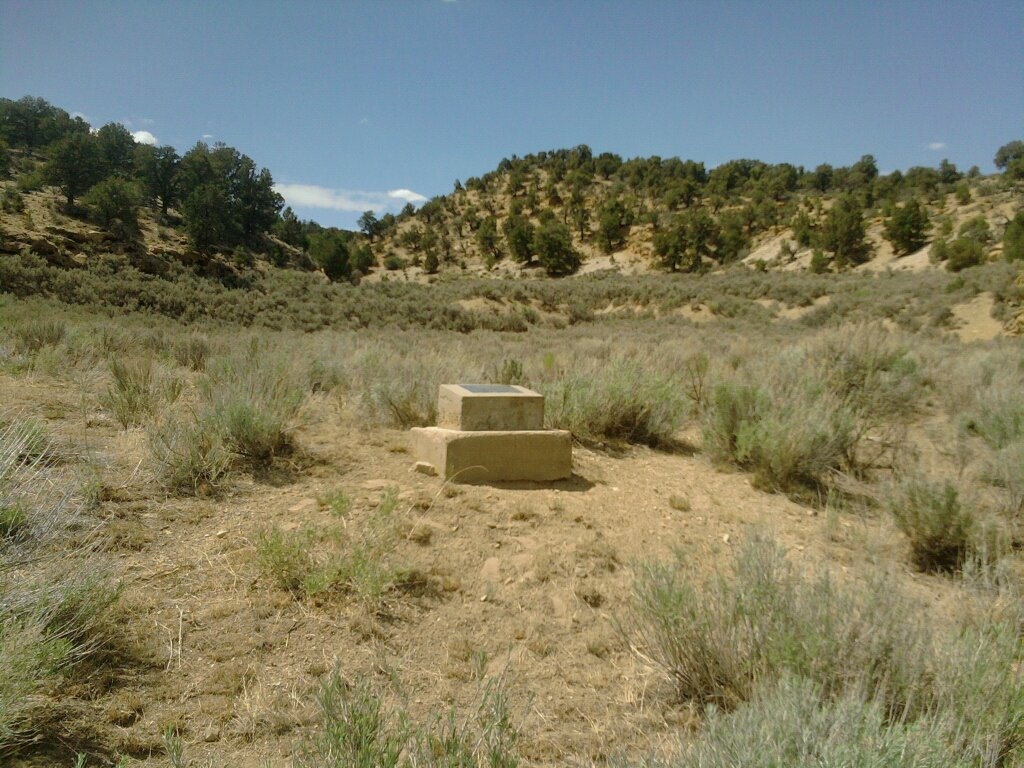
- Rio Blanco Test Site

Information
- Country: United States
- Test series: Operation Toggle; Operation Plowshare
- Test site: Rio Blanco Site, 39°47′34.8″N 108°22′4.8″W
- Date: May 17, 1973
- Test type: Underground
- Yield: 3x 33 kt

Project Rio Blanco was an underground nuclear test that took place on May 17, 1973 in Rio Blanco County, Colorado, approximately 36 miles (58 km) northwest of Rifle.

Three 33-kiloton nuclear devices were detonated nearly simultaneously in a single emplacement well at depths of 5,838, 6,230, and 6,689 feet (1,779, 1,899, and 2,039 m) below ground level. The tests were conducted in fine-grain, low-permeability sandstone lenses at the base of the Fort Union Formation and the upper portion of the Mesaverde Formation.

This was the third and final natural-gas-reservoir stimulation test in the Plowshare program, which was designed to develop peaceful uses for nuclear explosives. The two previous tests were Project Gasbuggy in New Mexico and Project Rulison in Colorado.

The United States Atomic Energy Commission conducted the test in partnership with CER Geonuclear Corporation and Continental Oil Company.

A placard, erected in 1976, now marks the site where the test was conducted. The site is accessible via a dirt road, Rio Blanco County Route 29.

== Devices ==
As the creation of tritium was of greatest concern, the three devices used were specially designed to reduce tritium production, creating less than 0.2 grams (0.0071 oz) tritium each, primarily from the medium surrounding the devices. To reduce emplacement costs, the devices were very narrow in diameter, less than 200 millimetres (7.9 in) wide.
