= Operation Fulcrum =

Series of 1970s US nuclear tests

Fulcrum

Information
- Country: United States
- Test site: NTS, Areas 1–4, 6–10, Yucca Flat
- Period: 1976–1977
- Number of tests: 21
- Test type: underground shaft
- Max. yield: 140 kilotonnes of TNT (590 TJ)

Test series chronology

The United States's Fulcrum nuclear test series was a group of 21 nuclear tests conducted in 1976–1977. These tests (Note: A bomb test may be a salvo test, defined as two or more explosions "where a period of time between successive individual explosions does not exceed 5 seconds and where the burial points of all explosive devices can be connected by segments of straight lines, each of them connecting two burial points and does not exceed 40 kilometers in length". Mikhailov, V. N., Editor in Chief. "Catalog of World Wide Nuclear Testing". Begell-Atom, LLC. Archived from the original on April 26, 2014. ;) followed the Operation Anvil (nuclear test) series and preceded the Operation Cresset series.

United States' Fulcrum series tests and detonations
Name (Note: The US, France and Great Britain have code-named their test events, while the USSR and China did not, and therefore have only test numbers (with some exceptions – Soviet peaceful explosions were named). Word translations into English in parentheses unless the name is a proper noun. A dash followed by a number indicates a member of a salvo event. The US also sometimes named the individual explosions in such a salvo test, which results in "name1 – 1(with name2)". If test is canceled or aborted, then the row data like date and location discloses the intended plans, where known.)	Date time (UT)	Local time zone (Note: To convert the UT time into standard local, add the number of hours in parentheses to the UT time; for local daylight saving time, add one additional hour. If the result is earlier than 00:00, add 24 hours and subtract 1 from the day; if it is 24:00 or later, subtract 24 hours and add 1 to the day. Historical time zone data obtained from the IANA time zone database.)	Location (Note: Rough place name and a latitude/longitude reference; for rocket-carried tests, the launch location is specified before the detonation location, if known. Some locations are extremely accurate; others (like airdrops and space blasts) may be quite inaccurate. "~" indicates a likely pro-forma rough location, shared with other tests in that same area.)	Elevation + height (Note: Elevation is the ground level at the point directly below the explosion relative to sea level; height is the additional distance added or subtracted by tower, balloon, shaft, tunnel, air drop or other contrivance. For rocket bursts the ground level is "N/A". In some cases it is not clear if the height is absolute or relative to ground, for example, Plumbbob/John. No number or units indicates the value is unknown, while "0" means zero. Sorting on this column is by elevation and height added together.)	Delivery (Note: Atmospheric, airdrop, balloon, gun, cruise missile, rocket, surface, tower, and barge are all disallowed by the Partial Nuclear Test Ban Treaty. Sealed shaft and tunnel are underground, and remained useful under the PTBT. Intentional cratering tests are borderline; they occurred under the treaty, were sometimes protested, and generally overlooked if the test was declared to be a peaceful use.) Purpose (Note: Include weapons development, weapon effects, safety test, transport safety test, war, science, joint verification and industrial/peaceful, which may be further broken down.)	Device (Note: Designations for test items where known, "?" indicates some uncertainty about the preceding value, nicknames for particular devices in quotes. This category of information is often not officially disclosed.)	Yield (Note: Estimated energy yield in tons, kilotons, and megatons. A ton of TNT equivalent is defined as 4.184 gigajoules (1 gigacalorie).)	Fallout (Note: Radioactive emission to the atmosphere aside from prompt neutrons, where known. The measured species is only iodine-131 if mentioned, otherwise it is all species. No entry means unknown, probably none if underground and "all" if not; otherwise notation for whether measured on the site only or off the site, where known, and the measured amount of radioactivity released.)	References	Notes
Gouda	October 6, 1976 14:30:00.164	PST (–8 hrs)	NTS Area U2ef	1,272 m (4,173 ft) – 200.1 m (656 ft)	underground shaft, weapons development		600 t			
Sprit	November 10, 1976 14:58:00.077	PST (–8 hrs)	NTS Area U3hc	1,192 m (3,911 ft) – 183.18 m (601.0 ft)	underground shaft, weapons development		less than 20 kt			
Chevre	November 23, 1976 15:15:00.163	PST (–8 hrs)	NTS Area U10ay	1,278 m (4,193 ft) – 317.3 m (1,041 ft)	underground shaft, weapons development		2 kt			
Redmud	December 8, 1976 14:49:30.083	PST (–8 hrs)	NTS Area U7ab	1,269 m (4,163 ft) – 426.72 m (1,400.0 ft)	underground shaft, weapons development		20 kt			
Asiago	December 21, 1976 15:09:00.166	PST (–8 hrs)	NTS Area U2ar	1,265 m (4,150 ft) – 330.8 m (1,085 ft)	underground shaft, weapons development		11 kt			
Sutter	December 21, 1976 15:58:00.162	PST (–8 hrs)	NTS Area U2bw	1,287 m (4,222 ft) – 200.3 m (657 ft)	underground shaft, weapons development		less than 20 kt			
Rudder	December 28, 1976 18:00:00.076	PST (–8 hrs)	NTS Area U7aj(s)	1,255 m (4,117 ft) – 638.56 m (2,095.0 ft)	underground shaft, weapons development		89 kt			
Cove - 1 (with Oarlock)	February 16, 1977 17:53:00.16	PST (–8 hrs)	NTS Area U3ki	1,181 m (3,875 ft) +	underground shaft, weapons development		3 kt			Simultaneous, separate holes.
Oarlock - 2 (with Cove)	February 16, 1977 17:53:00.073	PST (–8 hrs)	NTS Area U3km	1,183 m (3,881 ft) – 317.6 m (1,042 ft)	underground shaft, weapons development		8 kt			Simultaneous, separate holes.
Dofino - 1	March 8, 1977 14:24:00.164	PST (–8 hrs)	NTS Area U10ba	1,283 m (4,209 ft) – 182.88 m (600.0 ft)	underground shaft, weapons development		800 t	Venting detected, 25 Ci (920 GBq)		Simultaneous, same hole.
Dofino-Lawton - 2	March 8, 1977 14:24:00.16	PST (–8 hrs)	NTS Area U10ba	1,283 m (4,209 ft) – 282 m (925 ft)	underground shaft, weapons development		less than 20 kt	Venting detected		Simultaneous, same hole.
Marsilly	April 5, 1977 15:00:00.167	PST (–8 hrs)	NTS Area U2ei	1,259 m (4,131 ft) – 689.73 m (2,262.9 ft)	underground shaft, weapons development		140 kt	Venting detected, 15 Ci (560 GBq)		
Bulkhead	April 27, 1977 15:00:00.084	PST (–8 hrs)	NTS Area U7am	1,259 m (4,131 ft) – 594.36 m (1,950.0 ft)	underground shaft, weapons development		67 kt			
Crewline	May 25, 1977 17:00:00.076	PST (–8 hrs)	NTS Area U7ap	1,237 m (4,058 ft) – 564.18 m (1,851.0 ft)	underground shaft, weapons development		51 kt			
Forefoot	June 2, 1977 17:15:00.098	PST (–8 hrs)	NTS Area U3kF	1,207 m (3,960 ft) – 193.55 m (635.0 ft)	underground shaft, weapons development		less than 20 kt			
Carnelian	July 28, 1977 14:07:00.162	PST (–8 hrs)	NTS Area U4af	1,265 m (4,150 ft) – 208 m (682 ft)	underground shaft, weapons development		600 t	Venting detected, 7 Ci (260 GBq)		
Strake	August 4, 1977 16:40:00.074	PST (–8 hrs)	NTS Area U7ae	1,273 m (4,177 ft) – 517.55 m (1,698.0 ft)	underground shaft, weapons development		44 kt			
Gruyere - 1	August 16, 1977 14:41:00.165	PST (–8 hrs)	NTS Area U9cg	1,263 m (4,144 ft) – 206.96 m (679.0 ft)	underground shaft, weapons development		less than 20 kt			Simultaneous, same hole.
Gruyere-Gradino - 2	August 16, 1977 14:41:00.16	PST (–8 hrs)	NTS Area U9cg	1,263 m (4,144 ft) – 320 m (1,050 ft)	underground shaft, weapons development		600 t	Venting detected, 0.8 Ci (30 GBq)		Simultaneous, same hole.
Flotost	August 16, 1977 15:49:00.168	PST (–8 hrs)	NTS Area U2ao	1,284 m (4,213 ft) – 274.93 m (902.0 ft)	underground shaft, weapons development		1.5 kt	Venting detected, 3 Ci (110 GBq)		
Scupper	August 19, 1977 17:32:00.098	PST (–8 hrs)	NTS Area U3hj	1,185 m (3,888 ft) – 449.58 m (1,475.0 ft)	underground shaft, weapons development		200 t			
Scantling	August 19, 1977 17:55:00.1	PST (–8 hrs)	NTS Area U4h	1,246 m (4,088 ft) – 701.04 m (2,300.0 ft)	underground shaft, weapons development		120 kt			
Ebbtide	September 15, 1977 14:36:30.077	PST (–8 hrs)	NTS Area U3kt	1,194 m (3,917 ft) – 379.48 m (1,245.0 ft)	underground shaft, weapons development		6 kt			
Coulommiers	September 27, 1977 14:00:00.161	PST (–8 hrs)	NTS Area U2ei	1,292 m (4,239 ft) – 530.35 m (1,740.0 ft)	underground shaft, weapons development		20 kt	Venting detected, 0.9 Ci (33 GBq)		
