= Operation Bedrock =

Series of 1970s US nuclear tests

Information
- Country: United States
- Test site: NTS Area 12, Rainier Mesa; NTS Area 19, 20, Pahute Mesa; NTS, Areas 1–4, 6–10, Yucca Flat
- Period: 1974–1975
- Number of tests: 27
- Test type: underground shaft, tunnel
- Max. yield: 750 kilotonnes of TNT (3,100 TJ)

Test series chronology

The United States's Bedrock nuclear test series was a group of 27 nuclear tests conducted in 1974–1975. These tests (Note: A bomb test may be a salvo test, defined as two or more explosions "where a period of time between successive individual explosions does not exceed 5 seconds and where the burial points of all explosive devices can be connected by segments of straight lines, each of them connecting two burial points and does not exceed 40 kilometers in length". Mikhailov, V. N. "Catalog of World Wide Nuclear Testing". Begell-Atom. Archived from the original on April 26, 2014.) followed the Operation Arbor series and preceded the Operation Anvil series.

United States' Bedrock series tests and detonations
Name (Note: The US, France and Great Britain have code-named their test events, while the USSR and China did not, and therefore have only test numbers (with some exceptions – Soviet peaceful explosions were named). Word translations into English in parentheses unless the name is a proper noun. A dash followed by a number indicates a member of a salvo event. The US also sometimes named the individual explosions in such a salvo test, which results in "name1 – 1(with name2)". If test is canceled or aborted, then the row data like date and location discloses the intended plans, where known.)	Date time (UT)	Local time zone (Note: To convert the UT time into standard local, add the number of hours in parentheses to the UT time; for local daylight saving time, add one additional hour. If the result is earlier than 00:00, add 24 hours and subtract 1 from the day; if it is 24:00 or later, subtract 24 hours and add 1 to the day. Historical time zone data obtained from the IANA time zone database.)	Location (Note: Rough place name and a latitude/longitude reference; for rocket-carried tests, the launch location is specified before the detonation location, if known. Some locations are extremely accurate; others (like airdrops and space blasts) may be quite inaccurate. "~" indicates a likely pro-forma rough location, shared with other tests in that same area.)	Elevation + height (Note: Elevation is the ground level at the point directly below the explosion relative to sea level; height is the additional distance added or subtracted by tower, balloon, shaft, tunnel, air drop or other contrivance. For rocket bursts the ground level is "N/A". In some cases it is not clear if the height is absolute or relative to ground, for example, Plumbbob/John. No number or units indicates the value is unknown, while "0" means zero. Sorting on this column is by elevation and height added together.)	Delivery (Note: Atmospheric, airdrop, balloon, gun, cruise missile, rocket, surface, tower, and barge are all disallowed by the Partial Nuclear Test Ban Treaty. Sealed shaft and tunnel are underground, and remained useful under the PTBT. Intentional cratering tests are borderline; they occurred under the treaty, were sometimes protested, and generally overlooked if the test was declared to be a peaceful use.) Purpose (Note: Include weapons development, weapon effects, safety test, transport safety test, war, science, joint verification and industrial/peaceful, which may be further broken down.)	Device (Note: Designations for test items where known, "?" indicates some uncertainty about the preceding value, nicknames for particular devices in quotes. This category of information is often not officially disclosed.)	Yield (Note: Estimated energy yield in tons, kilotons, and megatons. A ton of TNT equivalent is defined as 4.184 gigajoules (1 gigacalorie).)	Fallout (Note: Radioactive emission to the atmosphere aside from prompt neutrons, where known. The measured species is only iodine-131 if mentioned, otherwise it is all species. No entry means unknown, probably none if underground and "all" if not; otherwise notation for whether measured on the site only or off the site, where known, and the measured amount of radioactivity released.)	References	Notes
Escabosa	July 10, 1974 16:00:00.092	PST (–8 hrs)	NTS Area U7ac 37.07498°N 116.03269°W	1,223 m (4,012 ft) – 638.52 m (2,094.9 ft)	underground shaft, weapons development	W76	150 kt	I-131 venting detected, 0		
Crestlake-Briar - 1	July 18, 1974 14:00:01.2	PST (–8 hrs)	NTS Area U2dw 37.11928°N 116.08601°W	1,274 m (4,180 ft) – 373.68 m (1,226.0 ft)	underground shaft, weapons development		less than 20 kt	Venting detected		Simultaneous, same hole.
Crestlake-Tansan - 2	July 18, 1974 14:00:01.2	PST (–8 hrs)	NTS Area U2dw 37.11928°N 116.08601°W	1,274 m (4,180 ft) – 272 m (892 ft)	underground shaft, weapons development		2 kt	Venting detected, 19 Ci (700 GBq)		Simultaneous, same hole.
Puye	August 14, 1974 14:00:00.11	PST (–8 hrs)	NTS Area U3jl 37.02342°N 116.03713°W	1,188 m (3,898 ft) – 430.08 m (1,411.0 ft)	underground shaft, weapons development		5 kt	I-131 venting detected, 0.000002 Ci (7.4×10^{−5} GBq)		First test of a TATB-based implosion system
Portmanteau	August 30, 1974 15:00:00.163	PST (–8 hrs)	NTS Area U2ax 37.1524°N 116.08456°W	1,313 m (4,308 ft) – 655.32 m (2,150.0 ft)	underground shaft, weapons development		160 kt			
Pratt	September 25, 1974 14:00:00.08	PST (–8 hrs)	NTS Area U3hq 37.01211°N 116.03103°W	1,183 m (3,881 ft) – 313.96 m (1,030.1 ft)	underground shaft, weapons development		5 kt			
Trumbull	September 26, 1974 14:30:00.164	PST (–8 hrs)	NTS Area U4aa 37.09316°N 116.09563°W	1,269 m (4,163 ft) – 262.74 m (862.0 ft)	underground shaft, weapons development		200 t			
Stanyan	September 26, 1974 15:05:00.17	PST (–8 hrs)	NTS Area U2aw 37.13258°N 116.06926°W	1,275 m (4,183 ft) – 573.02 m (1,880.0 ft)	underground shaft, weapons development		100 kt			
Estaca	October 17, 1974 17:13:00.118	PST (–8 hrs)	NTS Area U3ja 37.00639°N 116.01559°W	1,180 m (3,870 ft) – 321.05 m (1,053.3 ft)	underground shaft, weapons development	W76	less than 20 kt			
Hybla Fair	October 28, 1974 15:00:00.168	PST (–8 hrs)	NTS Area U12n.09 37.20108°N 116.20482°W	2,227 m (7,306 ft) – 404.47 m (1,327.0 ft)	tunnel, weapon effect		less than 20 kt	Venting detected, 500 Ci (18,000 GBq)		Test of a new line-of-sight pipe configuration for tunnel testing, basic measurements of blast parameters. The configuration proved to be inadequate for effects testing of warheads.
Temescal	November 2, 1974 15:30:00.164	PST (–8 hrs)	NTS Area U4ab 37.09314°N 116.09254°W	1,263 m (4,144 ft) – 262.74 m (862.0 ft)	underground shaft, weapons development		less than 20 kt	Venting detected, 2 Ci (74 GBq)		
Puddle	November 26, 1974 15:00:00.9	PST (–8 hrs)	NTS Area U3kg 37.00098°N 116.01207°W	1,169 m (3,835 ft) – 183.97 m (603.6 ft)	underground shaft, safety experiment		less than 20 kt			
Keel	December 16, 1974 17:30:00.088	PST (–8 hrs)	NTS Area U3hu 37.01136°N 116.01833°W	1,182 m (3,878 ft) – 304.72 m (999.7 ft)	underground shaft, weapons development	W76	4 kt			
Portola - 1	February 6, 1975 15:30:00.165	PST (–8 hrs)	NTS Area U10bb 37.17836°N 116.05243°W	1,285 m (4,216 ft) – 198.12 m (650.0 ft)	underground shaft, weapons development		350 t	Venting detected, 10 Ci (370 GBq)		Simultaneous, same hole.
Portola-Larkin - 2	February 6, 1975 15:30:00.16	PST (–8 hrs)	NTS Area U10bb 37.17836°N 116.05243°W	1,285 m (4,216 ft) – 274 m (899 ft)	underground shaft, weapons development		less than 20 kt	Venting detected		Simultaneous, same hole.
Teleme	February 6, 1975 16:13:00.17	PST (–8 hrs)	NTS Area U9cl 37.11422°N 116.02166°W	1,300 m (4,300 ft) – 304.8 m (1,000 ft)	underground shaft, weapons development		6 kt			
Bilge	February 19, 1975 20:10:00.224	PST (–8 hrs)	NTS Area U3kc 37.00219°N 116.02527°W	1,179 m (3,868 ft) – 318.35 m (1,044.5 ft)	underground shaft, weapons development		less than 20 kt	Venting detected		
Topgallant	February 28, 1975 16:15:00.09	PST (–8 hrs)	NTS Area U4e 37.10615°N 116.05712°W	1,245 m (4,085 ft) – 713.37 m (2,340.5 ft)	underground shaft, weapons development		160 kt			
Cabrillo	March 7, 1975 16:00:00.169	PST (–8 hrs)	NTS Area U2dr 37.13402°N 116.0852°W	1,288 m (4,226 ft) – 600.46 m (1,970.0 ft)	underground shaft, weapons development		89 kt	Venting detected, 11 Ci (410 GBq)		
Dining Car	April 5, 1975 19:45:00.187	PST (–8 hrs)	NTS Area U12e.18 37.18787°N 116.21476°W	2,238 m (7,343 ft) – 383.01 m (1,256.6 ft)	tunnel, weapon effect		20 kt			
Edam	April 24, 1975 14:10:00.17	PST (–8 hrs)	NTS Area U2dy 37.11569°N 116.08811°W	1,272 m (4,173 ft) – 411.48 m (1,350.0 ft)	underground shaft, weapons development		20 kt			
Obar	April 30, 1975 15:00:00.9	PST (–8 hrs)	NTS Area U7ag 37.10881°N 116.02967°W	1,279 m (4,196 ft) – 568.8 m (1,866 ft)	underground shaft, weapons development		38 kt			
Tybo	May 14, 1975 14:00:00.16	PST (–8 hrs)	NTS Area U20y 37.22071°N 116.47527°W	1,880 m (6,170 ft) – 765.05 m (2,510.0 ft)	underground shaft, weapons development		380 kt			
Stilton	June 3, 1975 14:20:00.17	PST (–8 hrs)	NTS Area U20p 37.34°N 116.52377°W	1,667 m (5,469 ft) – 731.52 m (2,400.0 ft)	underground shaft, weapons development		200 kt			
Mizzen	June 3, 1975 14:40:00.106	PST (–8 hrs)	NTS Area U7ah 37.09478°N 116.03697°W	1,247 m (4,091 ft) – 637.18 m (2,090.5 ft)	underground shaft, weapons development	W76	140 kt			
Alviso	June 11, 1975 13:00:00.167	PST (–8 hrs)	NTS Area U2du 37.11173°N 116.07457°W	1,261 m (4,137 ft) – 183 m (600 ft)	underground shaft, safety experiment		less than 20 kt			
Futtock	June 18, 1975 11:49:00.092	PST (–8 hrs)	NTS Area U3eh 37.06562°N 116.02271°W	1,221 m (4,006 ft) – 186.56 m (612.1 ft)	underground shaft, safety experiment		less than 20 kt			
Mast	June 19, 1975 13:00:00.09	PST (–8 hrs)	NTS Area U19u 37.35029°N 116.3211°W	2,068 m (6,785 ft) – 910.7 m (2,988 ft)	underground shaft, weapons development		520 kt			
Camembert	June 26, 1975 12:30:00.161	PST (–8 hrs)	NTS Area U19q 37.27887°N 116.36947°W	2,033 m (6,670 ft) – 1,310.64 m (4,300.0 ft)	underground shaft, weapons development		750 kt			
