= B77 nuclear bomb =

US gravity bomb designed in the 1970s for the B-1 Lancer

The B77 was a nuclear bomb designed in 1974 to match the delivery capabilities of the B-1A bomber. This included the ability to be dropped from supersonic speeds at altitudes of 60,000 feet (18,000 m), or in a laydown delivery at high subsonic speeds at altitudes as low as 100 feet (30 m). Meant to replace the Mk 28 and Mk 43 in the strategic role, the program was cancelled in December 1977 due to rising costs and the cancellation of the bomber it had been designed to serve. Many components of the B77 including its already tested physics package (the actual bomb core) were incorporated in the B83 which was developed in its place.

The specifications for the B77 required Full Fuzing Option (FUFO) and the ability for a low altitude, transonic laydown delivery, as well as a free fall from supersonic speeds and altitudes of 60,000 feet (18,000 m) delivery. To achieve the low-level delivery capability, the B77 employed a gas generator for roll control and a lifting parachute as the initial part of a two-stage parachute system. This combination would actually lift the bomb from a drop altitude of 100 to 300 feet (30 to 91 m) for main parachute opening. The roll control/parachute system was tested at Mach 2.2. From a delivery altitude of 100 feet (30 m) at Mach 2.2, the B77 could be slowed to 40 mph (64 km/h) allowing the delivery aircraft to be 2.3 miles (3.7 km) past ground zero. Actual detonation time could be varied after the laydown had occurred.

== See also ==
- List of nuclear weapons
