= Operation Cresset =

Series of 1970s US nuclear tests

Cresset

Information
- Country: United States
- Test site: NTS Area 12, Rainier Mesa; NTS Area 19, 20, Pahute Mesa; NTS, Areas 1–4, 6–10, Yucca Flat
- Period: 1977–1978
- Number of tests: 22
- Test type: underground shaft, tunnel
- Max. yield: 150 kilotonnes of TNT (630 TJ)

Test series chronology

Operation Cresset was a group of 22 nuclear tests conducted by the United States in 1977 and 1978. These tests (Note: A bomb test may be a salvo test, defined as two or more explosions "where a period of time between successive individual explosions does not exceed 5 seconds and where the burial points of all explosive devices can be connected by segments of straight lines, each of them connecting two burial points and does not exceed 40 kilometers in length".Mikhailov, V. N. (ed.). Catalog of World Wide Nuclear Testing (Report). Begell-Atom, LLC. Archived from the original on April 26, 2014.) followed the Operation Fulcrum series and preceded the Operation Quicksilver series.

US Cresset series tests and detonations
Name (Note: The US, France and Great Britain have code-named their test events, while the USSR and China did not, and therefore have only test numbers (with some exceptions – Soviet peaceful explosions were named). Word translations into English in parentheses unless the name is a proper noun. A dash followed by a number indicates a member of a salvo event. The US also sometimes named the individual explosions in such a salvo test, which results in "name1 – 1(with name2)". If test is canceled or aborted, then the row data like date and location discloses the intended plans, where known.)	Date time (UT)	Local time zone (Note: To convert the UT time into standard local, add the number of hours in parentheses to the UT time; for local daylight saving time, add one additional hour. If the result is earlier than 00:00, add 24 hours and subtract 1 from the day; if it is 24:00 or later, subtract 24 hours and add 1 to the day. Historical time zone data obtained from the IANA time zone database.)	Location (Note: Rough place name and a latitude/longitude reference; for rocket-carried tests, the launch location is specified before the detonation location, if known. Some locations are extremely accurate; others (like airdrops and space blasts) may be quite inaccurate. "~" indicates a likely pro-forma rough location, shared with other tests in that same area.)	Elevation + height (Note: Elevation is the ground level at the point directly below the explosion relative to sea level; height is the additional distance added or subtracted by tower, balloon, shaft, tunnel, air drop or other contrivance. For rocket bursts the ground level is "N/A". In some cases it is not clear if the height is absolute or relative to ground, for example, Plumbbob/John. No number or units indicates the value is unknown, while "0" means zero. Sorting on this column is by elevation and height added together.)	Delivery (Note: Atmospheric, airdrop, balloon, gun, cruise missile, rocket, surface, tower, and barge are all disallowed by the Partial Nuclear Test Ban Treaty. Sealed shaft and tunnel are underground, and remained useful under the PTBT. Intentional cratering tests are borderline; they occurred under the treaty, were sometimes protested, and generally overlooked if the test was declared to be a peaceful use.) Purpose (Note: Include weapons development, weapon effects, safety test, transport safety test, war, science, joint verification and industrial/peaceful, which may be further broken down.)	Device (Note: Designations for test items where known, "?" indicates some uncertainty about the preceding value, nicknames for particular devices in quotes. This category of information is often not officially disclosed.)	Yield (Note: Estimated energy yield in tons, kilotons, and megatons. A ton of TNT equivalent is defined as 4.184 gigajoules (1 gigacalorie).)	Fallout (Note: Radioactive emission to the atmosphere aside from prompt neutrons, where known. The measured species is only iodine-131 if mentioned, otherwise it is all species. No entry means unknown, probably none if underground and "all" if not; otherwise notation for whether measured on the site only or off the site, where known, and the measured amount of radioactivity released.)	References	Notes
Bobstay	October 26, 1977 14:15:00.08	PST (–8 hrs)	NTS Area U3jb 37.00759°N 116.01741°W	1,180 m (3,870 ft) – 381.3 m (1,251 ft)	underground shaft, weapons development		5 kt	I-131 venting detected, 0.000003 Ci (0.00011 GBq)		
Hybla Gold	November 1, 1977 18:06:00.07	PST (–8 hrs)	NTS Area U12e.20 37.18773°N 116.21384°W	2,239 m (7,346 ft) – 384.99 m (1,263.1 ft)	tunnel, weapon effect		10 kt	I-131 venting detected, 0		Shot to test the MX missile shallow buried trench basing concept to see if a nearby nuclear fireball would cause the trench to act as a shock tube.
Sandreef	November 9, 1977 22:00:00.075	PST (–8 hrs)	NTS Area U7aq 37.07217°N 116.05115°W	1,221 m (4,006 ft) – 700.74 m (2,299.0 ft)	underground shaft, weapons development		150 kt			
Seamount	November 17, 1977 19:30:00.077	PST (–8 hrs)	NTS Area U3kp 37.02055°N 116.02584°W	1,186 m (3,891 ft) - 370.09 m (1,214.2 ft)	underground shaft, weapons development		10 kt			
Rib	December 14, 1977 15:00:00.17	PST (–8 hrs)	NTS Area U3jv 37.01752°N 116.01864°W	1,184 m (3,885 ft) – 212.84 m (698.3 ft)	underground shaft, weapons development		800 t			
Farallones	December 14, 1977 15:30:00.07	PST (–8 hrs)	NTS Area U3fa 37.13573°N 116.08658°W	1,290 m (4,230 ft) – 668 m (2,192 ft)	underground shaft, weapons development		150 kt	Venting detected, 1 Ci (37 GBq)		
Campos	February 13, 1978 21:53:00.162	PST (–8 hrs)	NTS Area U9cp 37.12607°N 116.03261°W	1,269 m (4,163 ft) – 319.6 m (1,049 ft)	underground shaft, weapons development		800 t	Venting detected, 1.3 kCi (48 TBq)		
Reblochon	February 23, 1978 17:00:00.164	PST (–8 hrs)	NTS Area U2en 37.12363°N 116.0647°W	1,261 m (4,137 ft) – 658.4 m (2,160 ft)	underground shaft, weapons development		120 kt	Venting detected, 36 Ci (1,300 GBq)		
Karab	March 16, 1978 15:00:00.07	PST (–8 hrs)	NTS Area U4ah 37.08512°N 116.08249°W	1,247 m (4,091 ft) – 331 m (1,086 ft)	underground shaft, weapons development		1.5 kt	Venting detected		
Iceberg	March 23, 1978 16:30:00.2	PST (–8 hrs)	NTS Area U4g 37.10182°N 116.05236°W	1,239 m (4,065 ft) – 640.29 m (2,100.7 ft)	underground shaft, weapons development		120 kt			
Topmast	March 23, 1978 16:30:00.114	PST (–8 hrs)	NTS Area U7ay 37.09881°N 116.02049°W	1,282 m (4,206 ft) – 457.81 m (1,502.0 ft)	underground shaft, weapons development		less than 20 kt			
Backbeach	April 11, 1978 17:45:00.073	PST (–8 hrs)	NTS Area U19x 37.23344°N 116.36936°W	2,040 m (6,690 ft) – 671.78 m (2,204.0 ft)	underground shaft, weapons development		100 kt			
Asco	April 25, 1978 14:35:00.162	PST (–8 hrs)	NTS Area U10bc 37.15452°N 116.03563°W	1,285 m (4,216 ft) – 183 m (600 ft)	underground shaft, safety experiment		less than 20 kt			
Transom	May 10, 1978 15:00:00.07	PST (–8 hrs)	NTS Area U4f 37.08773°N 116.0535°W	1,231 m (4,039 ft) – 640 m (2,100 ft)	underground shaft, weapons development		no yield			Fizzle? Device destroyed by Quicksilver/Hearts detonation on 1979.
Jackpots	June 1, 1978 17:00:00.075	PST (–8 hrs)	NTS Area U3kj 37.02062°N 116.03267°W	1,186 m (3,891 ft) – 304.22 m (998.1 ft)	underground shaft, weapons development		600 t			
Satz	July 7, 1978 14:00:00.167	PST (–8 hrs)	NTS Area U2dq 37.11185°N 116.07796°W	1,263 m (4,144 ft) – 315 m (1,033 ft)	underground shaft, weapons development		1.5 kt	Venting detected		
Lowball	July 12, 1978 17:00:00.08	PST (–8 hrs)	NTS Area U7av 37.07861°N 116.04493°W	1,225 m (4,019 ft) – 564.88 m (1,853.3 ft)	underground shaft, weapons development		99 kt			
Panir	August 31, 1978 14:00:00.164	PST (–8 hrs)	NTS Area U19ys 37.27587°N 116.35823°W	2,013 m (6,604 ft) – 681 m (2,234 ft)	underground shaft, weapons development		140 kt			
Diablo Hawk	September 13, 1978 15:15:00.16	PST (–8 hrs)	NTS Area U12n.10a 37.20875°N 116.21165°W	2,212 m (7,257 ft) – 388 m (1,273 ft)	tunnel, weapon effect	Weapon effect on W87 warhead	8 kt			
Cremino - 1	September 27, 1978 16:30:00.165	PST (–8 hrs)	NTS Area U8e 37.17096°N 116.08804°W	1,341 m (4,400 ft) – 210 m (690 ft)	underground shaft, weapons development		250 t			Simultaneous, same hole.
Cremino-Caerphilly - 2	September 27, 1978 16:30:00.17	PST (–8 hrs)	NTS Area U8e 37.17096°N 116.08804°W	1,341 m (4,400 ft) +	underground shaft, weapons development		less than 20 kt			Simultaneous, same hole.
Draughts	September 27, 1978 17:00:00.071	PST (–8 hrs)	NTS Area U7al 37.07382°N 116.0207°W	1,234 m (4,049 ft) – 441.59 m (1,448.8 ft)	underground shaft, weapons development		25 kt			
Rummy	September 27, 1978 17:20:00.076	PST (–8 hrs)	NTS Area U7au 37.07974°N 116.05253°W	1,226 m (4,022 ft) – 639.78 m (2,099.0 ft)	underground shaft, weapons development		150 kt			
