= Dolphin striker =

Spar in ship's rigging

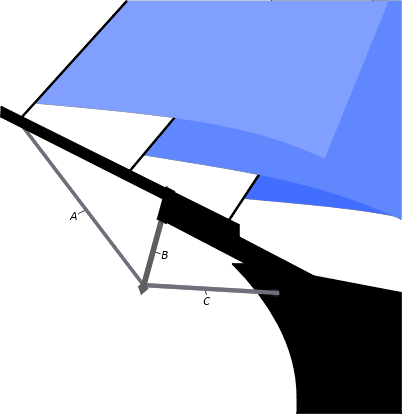
Schematic view of the bow of a ship, showing: A the martingale stay, B the dolphin striker and C the bobstay.

A dolphin striker (an older term for a martingale boom or simply a martingale; sometimes called a striker) is a small vertical or near vertical ancillary spar spanning between the bowsprit and martingale thereby redirecting the tension in the forward end of the martingale slightly more vertically. This vertical component is necessary to more effectively oppose the forestays' mostly upward tension on the forward end of the bowsprit than would be the case in the absence of the dolphin striker.

Around 1813 some large sailing vessels experimented with double strikers: these had two downward-pointing spars forming an inverted V in the middle of the bowsprit. However, the practice was short-lived as it did not seem to provide any additional benefit. The dolphin striker's length was typically half the length of the spritsail yard or, when spreaders were used, the same length as one spreader.

On a catamaran such as the Hobie 16 and the Tornado where the mast is stepped on a beam between the hulls the dolphin striker provides support for the beam in order to support the mast load.
