= Bowsprit =

Spar extending forward from a sailing vessel's prow

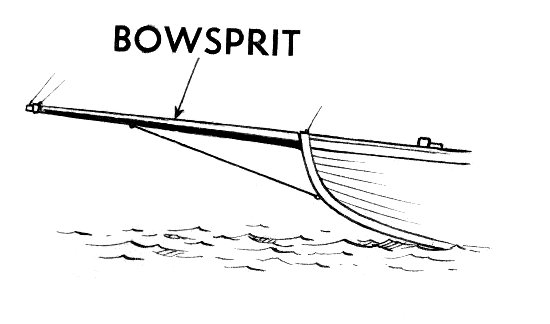
Bowsprit held down by a bobstay

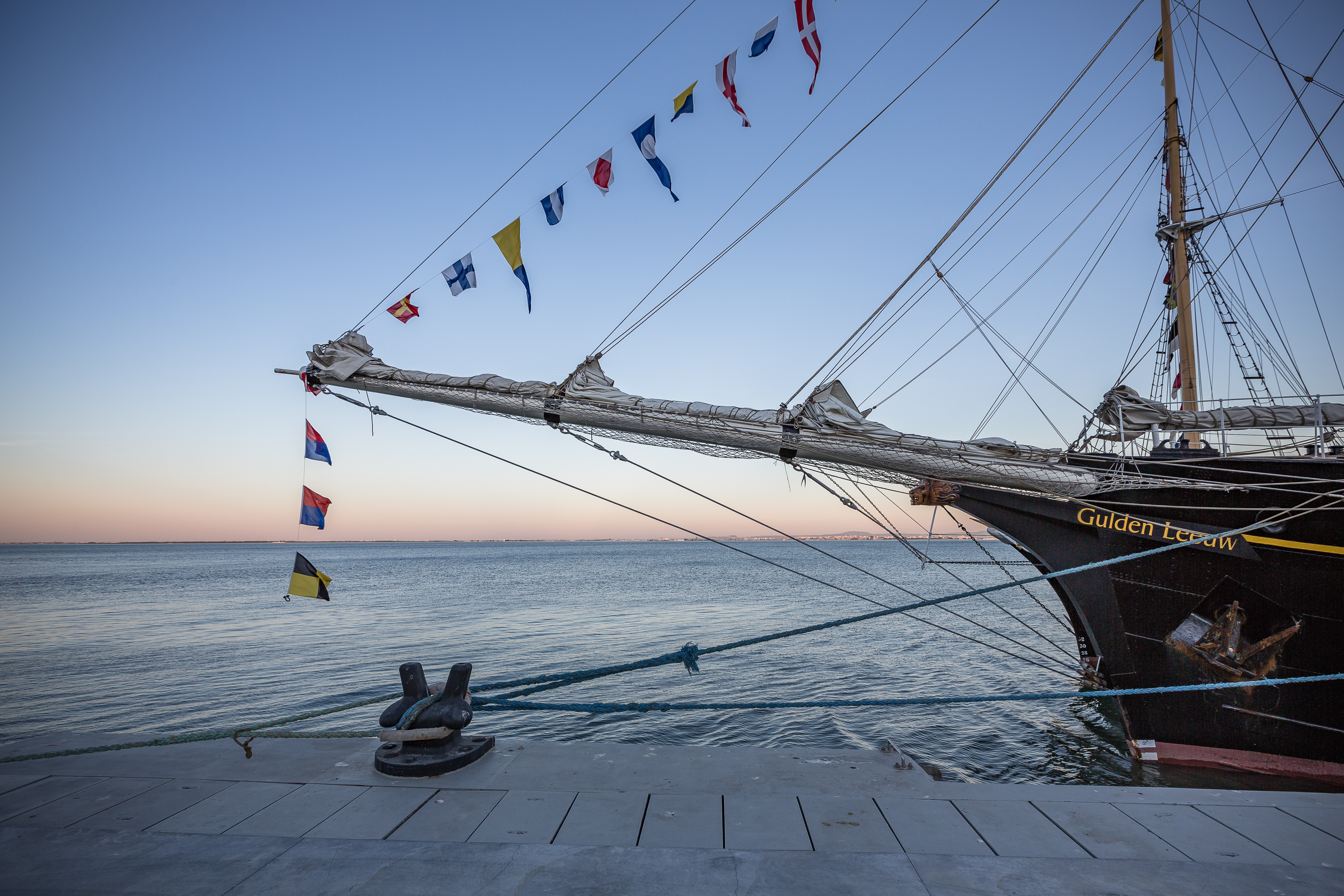
Bowsprit with forestays and bobstays

The bowsprit of a sailing vessel is a spar extending forward from the vessel's prow. The bowsprit is typically held down by a bobstay that counteracts the forces from the forestays. The bowsprit’s purpose is to create anchor points for the sails that extend beyond the vessel’s bow, increasing the size of sail that may be held taut.

The word bowsprit is thought to originate from the Middle Low German bōchsprēt – bōch 'bow', and sprēt 'pole'.

On some square-rigged ships a spritsail is flown below the bowsprit; these are sometimes accompanied by a sprit topmast, which serves to assist the spritsail while tacking. The bowsprit may also be used to hold up the figurehead.
