= Reliable Replacement Warhead =

Proposed US nuclear weapon

The Reliable Replacement Warhead (RRW) was a proposed new American nuclear warhead design and bomb family that was intended to be simple, reliable and to provide a long-lasting, low-maintenance future nuclear force for the United States. Initiated by the United States Congress in 2004, it became a centerpiece of the plans of the National Nuclear Security Administration (NNSA) to remake the nuclear weapons complex.

In 2008, Congress denied funding for the program, and in 2009 the Obama administration called for work on the program to cease.

== Background ==
During the Cold War, the United States, in an effort to achieve and maintain an advantage in the nuclear arms race with the Soviet Union, invested large amounts of money and technical resources into nuclear weapons design, testing, and maintenance. Many of the weapons designed required high upkeep costs, justified primarily by their Cold War context and the specific and technically sophisticated applications they were created for. With the end of the Cold War, however, nuclear testing has ceased in the United States, and new warhead development has been significantly reduced. As a result, the need for high technical performance of warheads has decreased considerably, and the need for a longer-lasting and reliable stockpile has taken a high priority.

Prior nuclear weapons produced by the U.S. had historically become extremely compact, low weight, highly integrated, and low-margin designs which used exotic materials. In many cases the components were toxic and/or unstable. A number of older US designs used high explosive types which degraded over time, some of which became dangerously unstable in short lifetimes (PBX 9404 and LX-09). Some of these explosives have cracked in warheads in storage, resulting in dangerous storage and disassembly conditions.

Most experts believe that the insensitive explosives (PBX 9502, LX-17) currently in use are highly stable and may even become more stable over time.

The use of beryllium and highly toxic beryllium oxide material as neutron reflector layers was a major health hazard to bomb manufacturer and maintenance staff. The long term stability of plutonium metal, which may lose strength, crack, or otherwise degrade over time is also a concern. (See Nuclear weapons design and Teller-Ulam design for technical context.)

The question of whether the plutonium-gallium alloy used in the cores of the weapons suffered from aging has been a major topic of research at the weapons laboratories in recent decades. Though many at the labs still insist on scientific uncertainty on the question, a study commissioned by the National Nuclear Security Administration to the independent JASON group concluded in November 2006 that "most plutonium pits have a credible lifetime of at least 100 years". The oldest pits currently in the US arsenal are still less than 50 years old.

== Concept ==
The concept underlying the RRW program is that the US weapons laboratories can design new nuclear weapons that are highly reliable and easy and safe to manufacture, monitor, and test. If that proves to be possible, designers could adapt a common set of core design components to various use requirements, such as different sized missile warheads, different nuclear bomb types, etc.

NNSA officials believe the program is needed to maintain nuclear weapons expertise in order to rapidly adapt, repair, or modify existing weapons or develop new weapons as requirements evolve. They see the ability to adapt to changing military needs rather than maintain additional forces for unexpected contingencies as a key program driver. However, Congress has rejected the notion that the RRW is needed to meet new military requirements. In providing funds for 2006, the Appropriations Committee specified, "any weapons design under the RRW program must stay within the military requirements of the existing deployed stockpile and any new weapon design must stay within the design parameters validated by past nuclear tests".

According to a Task Force of the Secretary of Energy's Advisory Board (SEAB), the RRW program and weapon designs should have the following characteristics:

- Support an adaptable 1,700-2,200 weapon sustained force level (3.1)
  - Resolve an issue with the weapons stockpile within 12 months
  - Adapt a weapon to a new requirement in 18 months
  - Design a new weapon within 36 months
  - Be ready for full production within 48 months
  - Be capable of conducting an underground nuclear test within 18 months
- Produce all new weapons using Insensitive High Explosive (see TATB and Plastic bonded explosive) and replace all existing weapons which use other explosives (3.1.2)
- Produce new weapons with the full spectrum of security and use control safety features available today, some of which are intrinsic to the basic design of a weapon and cannot possibly be retrofitted into the design of an existing weapon (3.1.3)
- Designs which trade off higher weight and larger volume to maximise: (3.1.4)
  - Certification without nuclear testing
  - Inexpensive manufacture and disassembly
  - Ease of maintenance, surveillance, and disposition
  - Modularity (primaries, secondaries, non-nuclear) across systems
  - Maximizing component reuse and minimizing life-cycle costs
- Comparable or improved levels of reliability to existing designs, using larger margins and simpler components (3.1.5)
- Lower cost (3.1.6)
- Designs which can be designed and certified without necessarily undergoing nuclear testing (3.1.7)
- Consolidation of many nuclear weapon production and maintenance functions to one site (4.1)
- (in passing) Designs avoiding the use of beryllium or beryllium Oxide in the weapon fission reflector (4.6)

However, the full SEAB disavowed the Task Force's recommendations regarding the RRW, because the Task Force did not consider the program's potentially adverse impacts on U.S. nonproliferation objectives, which were beyond its expertise.

The RRW program has not to date publicly announced that it has developed any new nuclear weapon designs which are intended to be placed into production. Presumably, once that occurs, the weapons will receive numbers in the US warhead designation sequence, which currently runs from the Mark 1 nuclear bomb (aka Little Boy) to the W92 nuclear warhead, which was cancelled in the 1990s. RRW designs would presumably receive designations after that number, though new RNEP nuclear bunker buster weapons could conceivably be type-standardized and numbered prior to any RRW reaching that point, if the RNEP program does proceed.

== Selected design ==
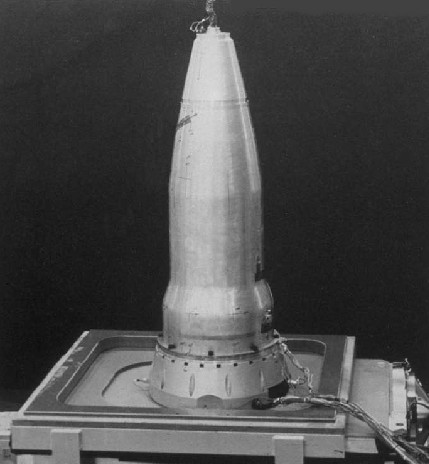
The W89 warhead design may have been the basis for the winning LLNL RRW design.

On March 2, 2007, the NNSA announced that the Lawrence Livermore National Laboratory RRW design had been selected for the initial RRW production version.

One of the selection reasons given was that the LLNL proposed design was more closely tied to historical underground tested warhead designs. It was described by Thomas P. D'Agostino, acting head of the National Nuclear Security Administration, as having been based on a design which was test fired in the 1980s, but never entered service.

LLNL staff have previously hinted in the press that LLNL was considering a design entry based on the tested but never deployed W89 design. This warhead had been proposed as a W88 warhead replacement as early as 1991. The W89 design was already equipped with all then-current safety features, including insensitive high explosives, fire-resistant pits, and advanced detonator safety systems. The W89 was also reportedly designed using recycled pits from the earlier W68 nuclear weapon program, recoated in vanadium to provide the temperature resistance. The W89 warhead was test fired in the 1980s. It had entered Phase 2A technical definition and cost study in November, 1986, and Phase 3 development engineering and was assigned the numerical designation W89 in January 1988. The lead designer, Bruce Goodwin, referred to the primary as the "SKUA9" design which he said had been tested a number of times.

The W89 warhead design was a 13.3-inch-diameter (340 mm) by 40.8-inch-long (1,040 mm) weapon, with a weight of 324 pounds (147 kg) and yield of 200 kilotonnes of TNT (840 TJ). As noted above, major safety features inherent in the tested W89 design include:

- Insensitive and fire-resistant LX-17 Polymer-bonded explosive, a type of high explosive using TATB as its main explosive ingredient (see Insensitive munitions)
- Fire-resistant pit
- Type D Permissive Action Link
- Strong link weak link detonation chain safety mechanisms

Modifications for the RRW design would probably have included replacing beryllium neutron reflector layers with another material, and increased performance margins throughout the design, possibly including more fissile material in the pit and a thicker radiation case or hohlraum (see Teller-Ulam design: Basic principle).

== History ==
=== 2006 ===
In an April 15, 2006, article by Walter Pincus in the Washington Post, Linton F. Brooks, administrator of the US National Nuclear Safety Administration, the US nuclear weapon design agency within the United States Department of Energy, announced that two competing designs for the Reliable Replacement Warhead were being finalized by Lawrence Livermore National Laboratory and Los Alamos National Laboratory, and that a selection of one of those designs would be made by November 2006, to allow the RRW development program to be included in the Fiscal 2008 US government budget.

The article confirmed prior descriptions of the RRW, describing the weapons in the following terms:

The next-generation warheads will be larger and more stable than the existing ones but slightly less powerful, according to government officials. They might contain "use controls" that would enable the military to disable the weapons by remote control if they are stolen by terrorists.

Based on prior weapons programs, the RRW should be assigned a numerical weapon designation when the design selection is made.

On December 1, 2006, the NNSA announced that it had decided to move forwards with the RRW program after analyzing the initial LLNL and LANL RRW proposals. At that time, NNSA's Nuclear Weapons Council had not selected which of the two designs to proceed forwards with.

=== 2007 ===
According to the FY 2008 NNSA budget (pp 88), the RRW program is described as:

The NWC approved the RRW Feasibility Study that began in May 2005 and completed in November 2006. The goal of the RRW study was to identify designs that will sustain long term confidence in a safe, secure and reliable stockpile and enable transformation to a responsive nuclear weapon infrastructure. The joint DOE/DoD RRW POG was tasked to oversee a laboratory design competition for a RRW warhead with FPU goal of FY 2012. The POG assessed the technical feasibility including certification without nuclear testing, design definition, manufacturing, and an initial cost assessment to determine whether the proposed candidates met the RRW study objectives and requirements. The POG presented the RRW study results to the NWC in November 2006 and the NWC decided that the RRW for submarine-launched ballistic missiles is feasible and should proceed to complete a Phase 2A design definition and cost study. In addition, the NWC determined that the RRW is to be adopted as the strategy for maintaining a long term safe, secure and reliable nuclear deterrent and as such also directed the initiation of a conceptual study for an additional RRW design. The next steps include detailed design and preliminary cost estimates of the RRW to confirm that the RRW design provides surety enhancements, can be certified without nuclear testing, is cost-effective, and will support both stockpile and infrastructure transformation. Once this acquisition planning is completed and if the NWC decides to proceed to engineering and production development, outyear funding (FY 2009 – FY 2012) to support an executable program will be submitted.

And (pp 94)

Reliable Replacement Warhead
The increase funds the startup of activities in support of a NWC decision to have RRW proceed to engineering and production development. Activities include design, engineering and certification work such as finalization of requirements, material studies, technology demonstrations, detailed design and concurrent engineering with the production plants, and modeling, simulation and analysis in support of certification without additional nuclear testing.

Funding is listed as $25 million for FY 2006, $28 million for FY 2007, and $89 million for FY 2008.

As defined in an earlier UC report, nuclear weapons engineering phases are:

- phase 2 = competitive feasibility study; phase 2A = design definition and cost study by the lab to which DOE awarded the project; phase 3 = development engineering (at beginning of this phase warhead is assigned a #); phase 4 = production engineering; phase 5 = first production; phase 6 = quantity production and stockpiling. Note: Projects entering phase 1 (concept study) and phase 7 (=retirement) have not been included.

The FY08 RRW budget therefore indicates that one of the RRW designs has been approved and is entering the design definition and cost study phase. The document does not state which of the RRW designs has been selected.

Historically, the weapon's nuclear series identification is assigned at the entrance to phase 3, and if the design proceeds forwards to complete phase 2 and enter phase 3 this can be expected in 1–2 years.

The design is intended for first production unit (FPU) delivery by the end of 2012.

On March 2, 2007, the NNSA announced that the Lawrence Livermore National Laboratory RRW design had been selected for the initial RRW production version.

=== 2008 ===
The National Defense Authorization Act for Fiscal Year 2008, H.R. 4986, Section 3111, forbids the expenditure of funds for the RRW program beyond Phase 2A; in effect, this prevents the RRW program from going forward without explicit Congressional authorization. Section 3121 Subsection 1 requires the study of the reuse of previously manufactured plutonium cores in any RRW warheads, so as to avoid the manufacture of additional plutonium cores. Section 3124 reaffirms the commitment of the U.S. to the Treaty on the Non-Proliferation of Nuclear Weapons and encourages the mutual reduction in armament of the U.S. and Russia through negotiation.

=== 2009 ===
President Obama's 2009 Department of Energy budget calls for development work on the Reliable Replacement Warhead project to cease.

== Criticisms of the program ==
Opponents of the RRW program believe it has nothing to do with making US weapons safer or more reliable, but is merely an excuse for designing new weapons and maintaining jobs at the weapons laboratories. They note that the Secretaries of Defense and Energy have certified that the existing nuclear weapons stockpile is safe and reliable in each of the last nine years. The existing stockpile was extensively tested before the US entered the moratorium on nuclear weapons tests. According to Sidney Drell and Ambassador James Goodby, "It takes an extraordinary flight of imagination to postulate a modern new arsenal composed of such untested designs that would be more reliable, safe and effective than the current U.S. arsenal based on more than 1,000 tests since 1945".

Critics maintain that this innocuous-sounding program could significantly damage US national security. Critics believe an expansive RRW program would anger US allies as well as hostile nations. They worry it would disrupt the global cooperation in nonproliferation that is vital to diplomacy with emerging nuclear powers such as Iran and North Korea and to controlling clandestine trafficking in nuclear materials and equipment.

== See also ==
- Fogbank
- Nuclear weapon design
- List of nuclear weapons
- Renovation of the nuclear weapon arsenal of the United States
