= RRW =

RRW may refer to:

- Reliable Replacement Warhead, American nuclear warhead design
- Rwanda, ITU country code
