= B61 nuclear bomb =

US Nuclear bomb

B61
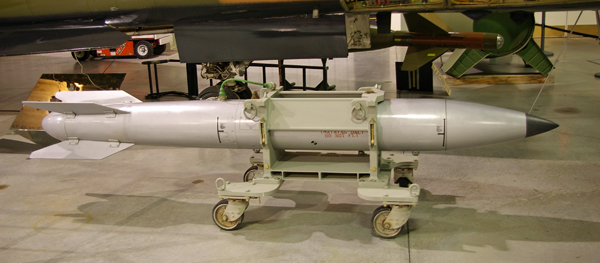
- B61 training unit intended for ground crew. It accurately replicates the shape and size of a "live" B61 (together with its safety/arming mechanisms) but contains only inert materials
- Type: Nuclear bomb

Service history
- Used by: United States

Production history
- Designer: Los Alamos National Laboratory
- Designed: 1963
- Manufacturer: Pantex Plant
- Produced: 1968 (full production)
- No. built: 3,155
- Variants: 14

Specifications
- Mass: B61-0: 715 pounds (324 kg); B61-0/1/2/5: 716 ± 10 pounds (325 ± 5 kg); B61-3/4: 751 ± 15 pounds (341 ± 7 kg); B61-6: 768 pounds (348 kg); B61-7: 763 ± 15 pounds (346 ± 7 kg); B61-8: 770 pounds (350 kg); B61-11: 1210 ± 15 pounds (549 ± 7 kg); B61-12: 825 pounds (374 kg)
- Length: 141.6 inches (3.60 m)
- Diameter: 13.3 inches (34 cm)
- Blast yield: Believed to be either 0.3–340 kt (1.25-1,422 TJ) or 0.3–400 kt (1.25-1,673 TJ) in the weapon's various mods.

The B61 nuclear bomb is the primary thermonuclear gravity bomb in the United States Enduring Stockpile following the end of the Cold War. It is a low-to-intermediate yield strategic and tactical nuclear weapon featuring a two-stage radiation implosion design.

The B61 is of the variable yield ("dial-a-yield" in informal military jargon) design with a yield of 0.3 to 340 kilotons in its various mods ("modifications"). It is a Full Fuzing Option (FUFO) weapon, meaning it is equipped with several fuzing options including air burst, ground burst, free-fall, retarded free-fall (parachuted) and laydown delivery. It has a streamlined casing allowing its release by supersonic aircraft. It is 11 ft 8 in (3.56 m) long, with a diameter of about 13 inches (33 cm); the basic weight of the B61 is about 700 pounds (320 kg), with weight differences for parachute delivery. As of 2020, the weapon was undergoing a 12th modification. In 2012, the roughly 400 B61-12s were estimated to each cost "more than its weight in gold" – $28 million apiece.

As of 2026, approximately 505 B61s are in service. The strategic B61-11 nuclear bunker buster is believed to be the only nuclear weapon assigned to the B-2 Spirit stealth strategic bomber, which can carry up to sixteen. The B61-12 is the only remaining US tactical nuclear weapon, with 200 stockpiled, approximately 100 in the US, and another 100 in certain European NATO member states under its nuclear sharing arrangement, maintained by munitions squadrons. The B61-12 is certified for delivery by the F-35A Lightning II stealth fifth generation fighter, and F-15E Strike Eagle, F-16 Fighting Falcon, and Panavia Tornado IDS fourth generation fighters. Alongside the United States Air Force, the air forces of Belgium, Germany, Italy, the Netherlands, Turkey, and the United Kingdom are believed to host B61-12 bombs, and operate a mixture of the aircraft certified to deliver them. The B61-13 is being developed as a strategic bunker buster for the forthcoming US B-21 Raider strategic bomber.

B61 variants have been previously deployed on many U.S. aircraft, such as the B-52 Stratofortress and B-1 Lancer strategic bombers; F-117 Nighthawk and F-111 Aardvark ground-based attack aircraft, F/A-18 Hornet and A-7 Corsair II carrier-based attack aircraft.

== Development ==
The development and production of B61.

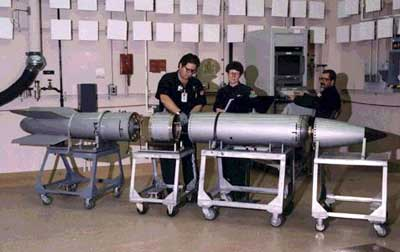
A B61 bomb undergoing disassembly.

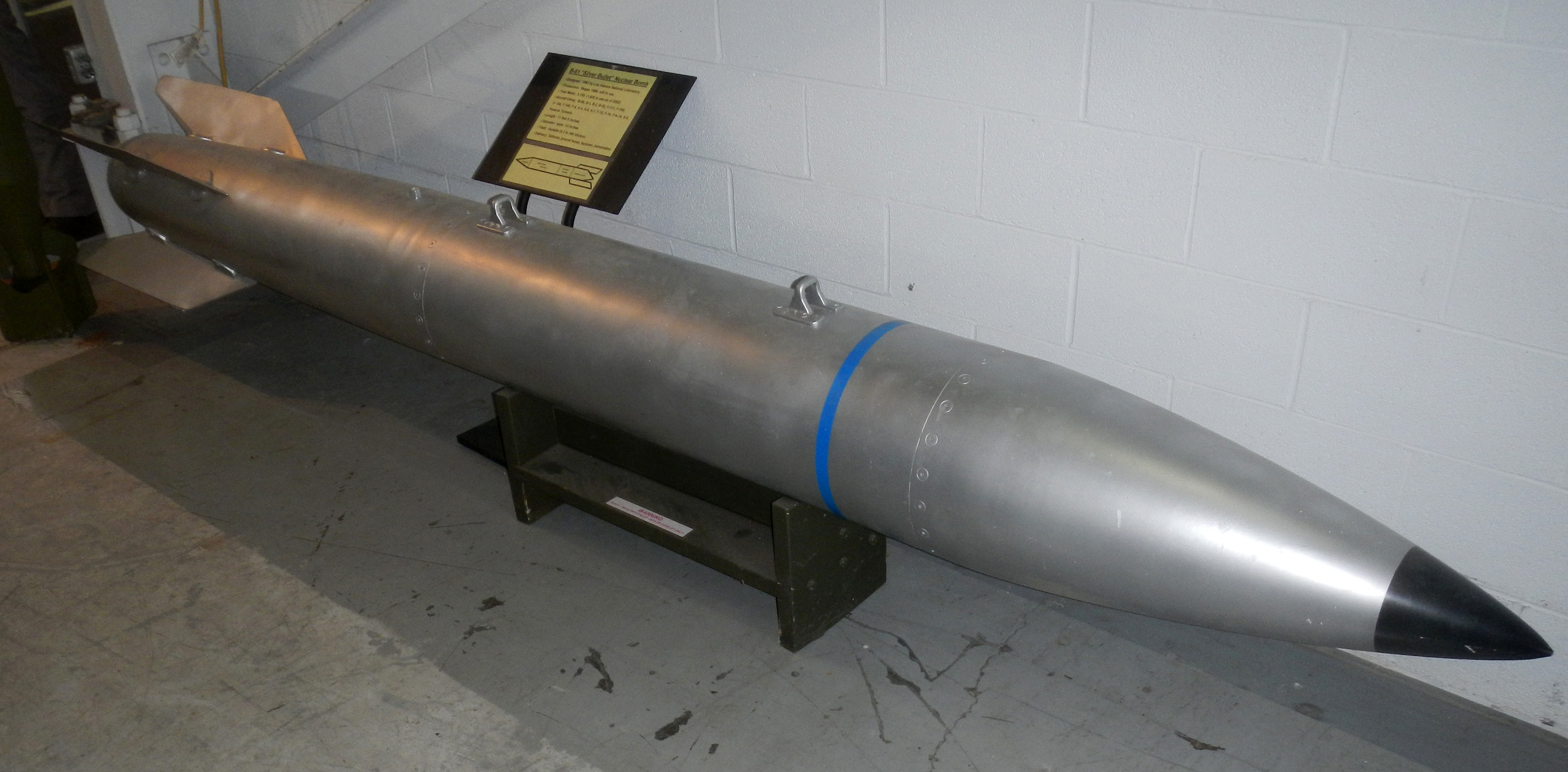
B61 bomb casing; MAPS Air Museum, North Canton, Ohio.

In 1961, a report was issued indicating Navy and Air Force interest in a lightweight bomb to replace existing weapons, but that both services had considerably different military requirements for such a weapon. However, the authors of the report believed that due to advances in technology it was possible for a single weapon to fulfill both requirements. This was followed by a report from Sandia in mid-1962, that believed that a lightweight nuclear bomb with full fuzing option was possible and that such a program could be completed in a short time-span, possibly by 1965 or 1966.

Development of the weapon that would become the B61 was authorized in December 1962. The justification for the program was that the new weapon would modernize the nuclear arsenal, improve the capability of aircraft and simplify the nuclear weapons inventory by replacing lower-yield versions of the B28 and B43 nuclear bombs. The desired production date was June 1965.

The weapon was designated the TX-61 in January 1963. Due to the short time-scales, it was decided to make maximum use of off-the-shelf components such as those developed for the B57 nuclear bomb. Environmental conditions specified included an indefinite temperature range of −60 to 160 °F (−51 to 71 °C), shocks of up to 40 g (390 m/s^{2}), and in flight temperatures of up to 275 °F (135 °C) for up to 40 minutes. Parachute deployment was specified to produce a maximum load of 255 g (2,500 m/s^{2}).

The weapon was designed and built by the Los Alamos National Laboratory in New Mexico. Production engineering began in 1965, with the first war-reserve B61-0 weapon accepted by the AEC in December 1966. However production was halted in May 1967 for design modifications to be made before resuming in January 1968. Shot Flintlock Halfbeak in June 1966 may have been a full yield test of the weapon with other tests conducted between 1963 and 1968 at the Nevada Test Site.

During testing, spin motors were added to the weapon to produce a spin of 5 revolutions per second. This was to improve stability and decoupling during high speed delivery. Three alternatives to the weapon were also explored for still-classified reasons. The first alternative was halted due to its similarity to the original TX-61 design, and the Department of Defense was unfavorable to the second option which halted its exploration. The TX-61 design was ordered to "proceed along the lines" of the third alternative in May 1964, though it is unclear what that means.

Total production of all versions was approximately 3,155, of which approximately 540 remain in active service, 415 in inactive service and 520 are awaiting dismantlement as of 2012.

Fourteen versions of the B61 have been designed, known as Mod 0 through Mod 13 (see table below). Each shares the same physics package, with different yield options. One variant is the Mod 11, deployed in 1997, which is a ground-penetrating bunker busting weapon. The Russian Continuity of Government facility at Kosvinsky Kamen, finished in early 1996, was designed to resist US earth-penetrating warheads and serves a similar role as the American Cheyenne Mountain Complex. The timing of the Kosvinsky completion date is regarded as one explanation for US interest in a new nuclear bunker buster and the declaration of the deployment of the Mod 11 in 1997: Kosvinsky is protected by about 1,000 feet (300 m) of granite.

The B61 unguided bomb should not be confused with the MGM-1 Matador cruise missile, which was originally developed under the bomber designation B61.

== Deployment ==
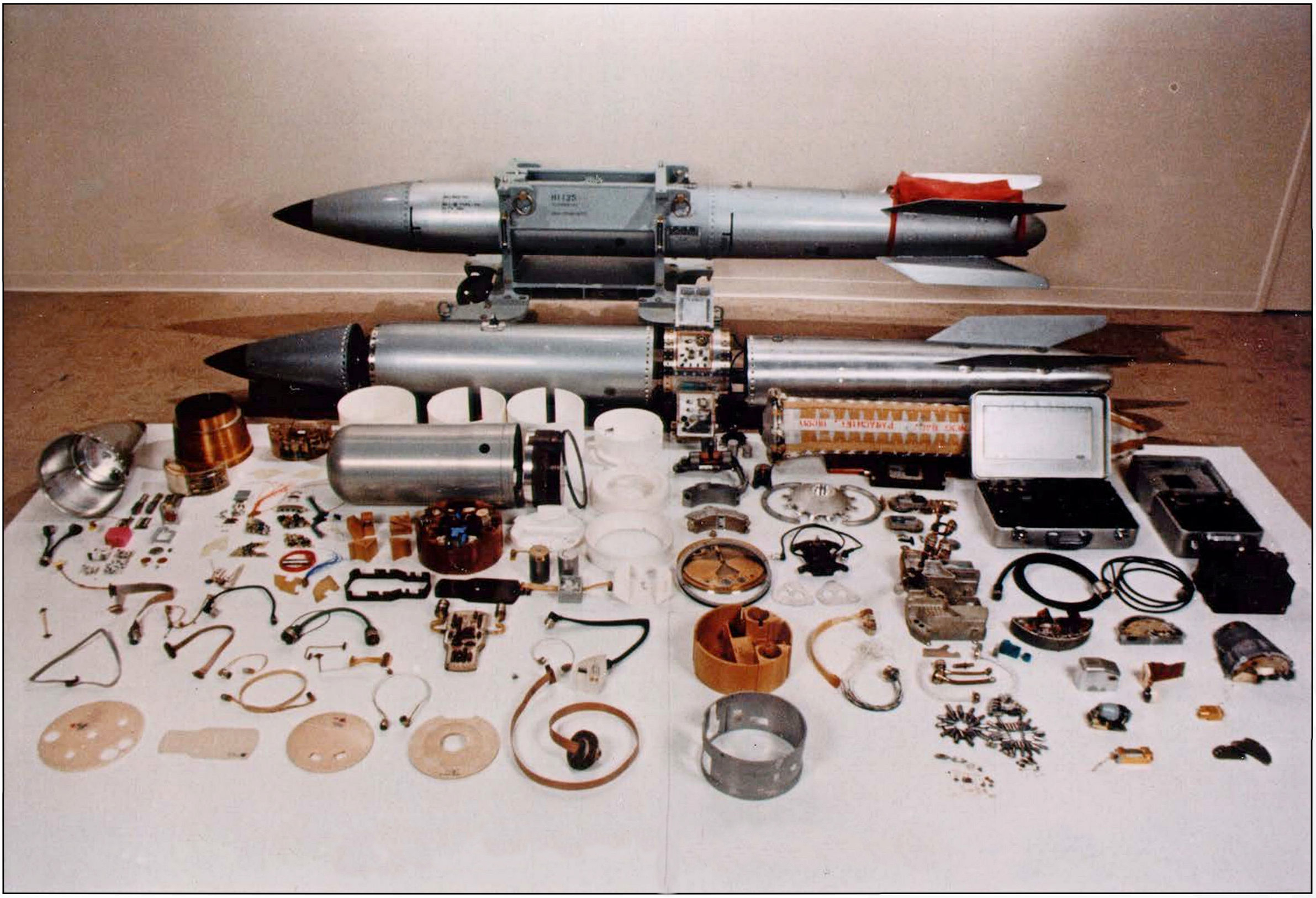
B61 bomb components. The physics package is contained in the silver cylinder center-left

The B61 has been deployed by a variety of US military aircraft. US aircraft cleared for its use have included the B-1 Lancer, B-2 Spirit, B-52 Stratofortress, F/A-18 Hornet, A-6 Intruder, A-4 Skyhawk, F-111, F-15E Strike Eagle, F-16 Fighting Falcon and the F-35A. As part of NATO Nuclear Weapons Sharing, German and Italian Panavia Tornado aircraft can also carry B61s. The B61 can fit inside the F-22 Raptor's weapons bays.

B61 tactical variants are deployed with NATO allies in Europe as part of the NATO Nuclear Weapons Sharing Program. About 150 bombs are stored at six bases: Kleine Brogel in Belgium, Büchel Air Base in Germany, Aviano and Ghedi Air Base in Italy, Volkel Air Base in the Netherlands and Incirlik in Turkey. In 2012, NATO agreed to improve the capabilities of this force with the increased accuracy of the Mod 12 upgrade and the delivery of the F-35 aircraft. This added a modest standoff capability to the B61. The F-35A was certified to carry the B61-12 in October 2023, marking the first time an American fifth generation fighter has been certified as nuclear capable, and the first new platform in the NATO inventory to achieve such status since the early 1990s.

In June 2025, the UK announced that it will purchase 12 F-35A fighter jets and formally join NATO’s Dual Capable Aircraft (DCA) nuclear sharing mission and will also buy the B61-12. The F-35A, a conventional take-off variant, is nuclear-capable and interoperable with US B61-12 gravity bombs, which already forms the core of NATO’s air-delivered nuclear capability.

== Design ==
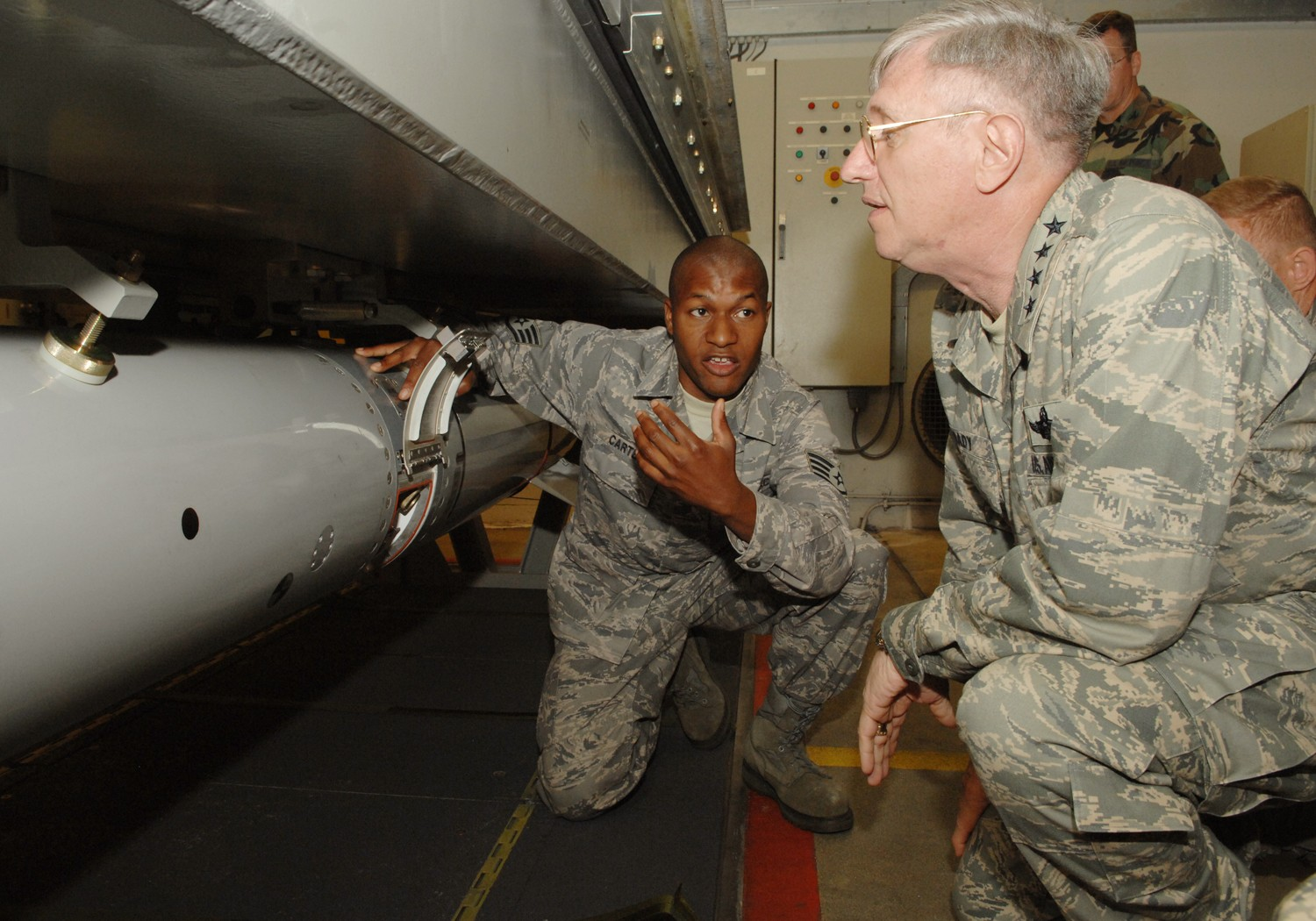
Inert training version of a B61 in an underground Weapons Storage and Security System (WS3) vault at Volkel Air Base, Netherlands. An access panel on the warhead is open, showing the interface for actions such as PAL (safety/arming) and variable yield setting

The B61 is a variable yield ("dial-a-yield" colloquially) dual use tactical and strategic bomb equipped with Full Fuzing Option (FUFO) designed for external carriage by high-speed aircraft. It has a streamlined casing capable of withstanding supersonic flight. The original B61-0 weapon was 141.6 inches (3.60 m) long, with a diameter of 13.3 inches (340 mm) and a basic weight of 715 pounds (324 kg) with most later weapons having approximately the same dimensions and weight, except for the Mod 11 version which has a weight of approximately 1,200 pounds (540 kg).

=== Ground operations ===
The B61 is armed by ground-based personnel via an access panel located on the side of the bomb, which opens to reveal nine dials, two sockets, and a T-handle which manually triggers the "command disable" function. One of the sockets is for a MC4142 "strike enable" plug which must be inserted in order to complete critical circuits in the safety/arming and firing mechanisms. The other socket is the PAL connector, which has 23 pins marked with alphabetic letter codes.

The B61 "command disable" mechanism functions as follows: after entering the correct three-digit numeric code it is then possible to turn a dial to "DI" and pull back a T-shaped handle which comes away in the user's hand. This action releases a spring-loaded firing pin which fires the percussion cap on an MC4246A thermal battery, powering it up. Electrical power from the thermal battery is sufficient to "fry" the internal circuitry of the bomb, destroying critical mechanisms without causing detonation. This makes the bomb incapable of being used. Any B61 which has had the command disable facility activated must be returned to Pantex for repair.

=== Fuzing and delivery ===
The B61 can be set for airburst or groundburst detonation, and by free fall, retarded free fall or laydown delivery through the use of a parachute to slow down the weapon during release from the delivery aircraft. Only the Mod 0 to 10 versions of the B61 are equipped with a parachute retarder (currently a 24-ft (7.3 m) diameter nylon/Kevlar chute). This offers the aircraft a chance to escape the blast in its retarded delivery modes, or allows the weapon to survive impact with the ground in laydown delivery mode. Contact preclusion can also be selected by the pilot. The weapon can be released at speeds up to Mach 2 and altitudes as low as 50 feet (15 m). In one of the weapon's laydown modes, it detonates 31 seconds after weapon release.

The Mod 11 is a hardened penetration bomb with a reinforced casing and a delayed-action fuze; this allows the weapon to penetrate several metres into the ground before detonating, damaging fortified structures further underground. Developed from 1994, the Mod 11 went into service in 1997 replacing the older megaton-yield B53 bomb. About 50 Mod 11 bombs have been produced, their warheads converted from Mod 7 bombs. At present, the primary carrier for the Mod 11 is the B-2 Spirit.

== Variants ==
As of 2025, the B61 has 14 variants, referred to as Mod 0 through Mod 13.

Mod	Status	Date (Note: In this context, date means from the start of Phase 6 full scale production to the retirement of the final weapon at the end of Phase 7.)	Number produced	Role	Yields	PAL type	Notes
0	Retired	1/67 to 9/93	500	Tactical	10 to 300 kt	Cat B	First production weapons
1	Retired	2/69 to 9/89	700	Strategic	10 to 340 kt	None	
2	Retired	6/75 to 9/94	235	Tactical	10 to 150 kt	Cat D	
3	Active	10/79 to present	545	Tactical	0.3, 1.5, 60, or 170 kt	Cat F	
4	Active	8/79 to present	695	Tactical	0.3, 1.5, 10, or 45 kt	Cat F	
5	Retired	6/77 to 9/93	265	Tactical	10 to 150 kt	Cat D	
6	Never entered production				10 to 150 kt	Cat D	Conversion of Mod 0. Cancelled February 1992.
7	Active	9/85 to present	600	Strategic	Allegedly 4 yield settings, including 10, or 340 kt.	Cat D	Conversion of Mod 1, conversion completed by April 1990
8	Never entered production				10 to 150 kt	Cat D	Conversion of Mod 2 and Mod 5. Cancelled February 1992.
9	Never entered production				10 to 300 kt	Cat F	Conversion of Mod 0. Cancelled September 1991.
10	Inactive stockpile	8/90 to present	215	Tactical	0.3, 5, 10, or 80 kt	Cat F	Remanufactured from retired Pershing II W85 warheads.
11	Active	12/96 to present	50	Strategic	Disputed, either same as Mod 7 or 400 kt	Cat F	Conversion of Mod 7, earth penetrating weapon.
12	Active	First production unit 11/21	400 to 500 weapons planned	Tactical/Strategic	0.3, 1.5, 10, or 50 kt	Cat F	Conversion of Mod 4. To replace the Mods 3, 4 and 7.
13	Active	First production unit 5/25	"a few dozen"	Tactical/Strategic	Allegedly 4 yield settings, including 10, or 340 kt.	?	Conversion of Mod 7 using B61-12 technology.

=== B61 Mod 3 and 4 ===
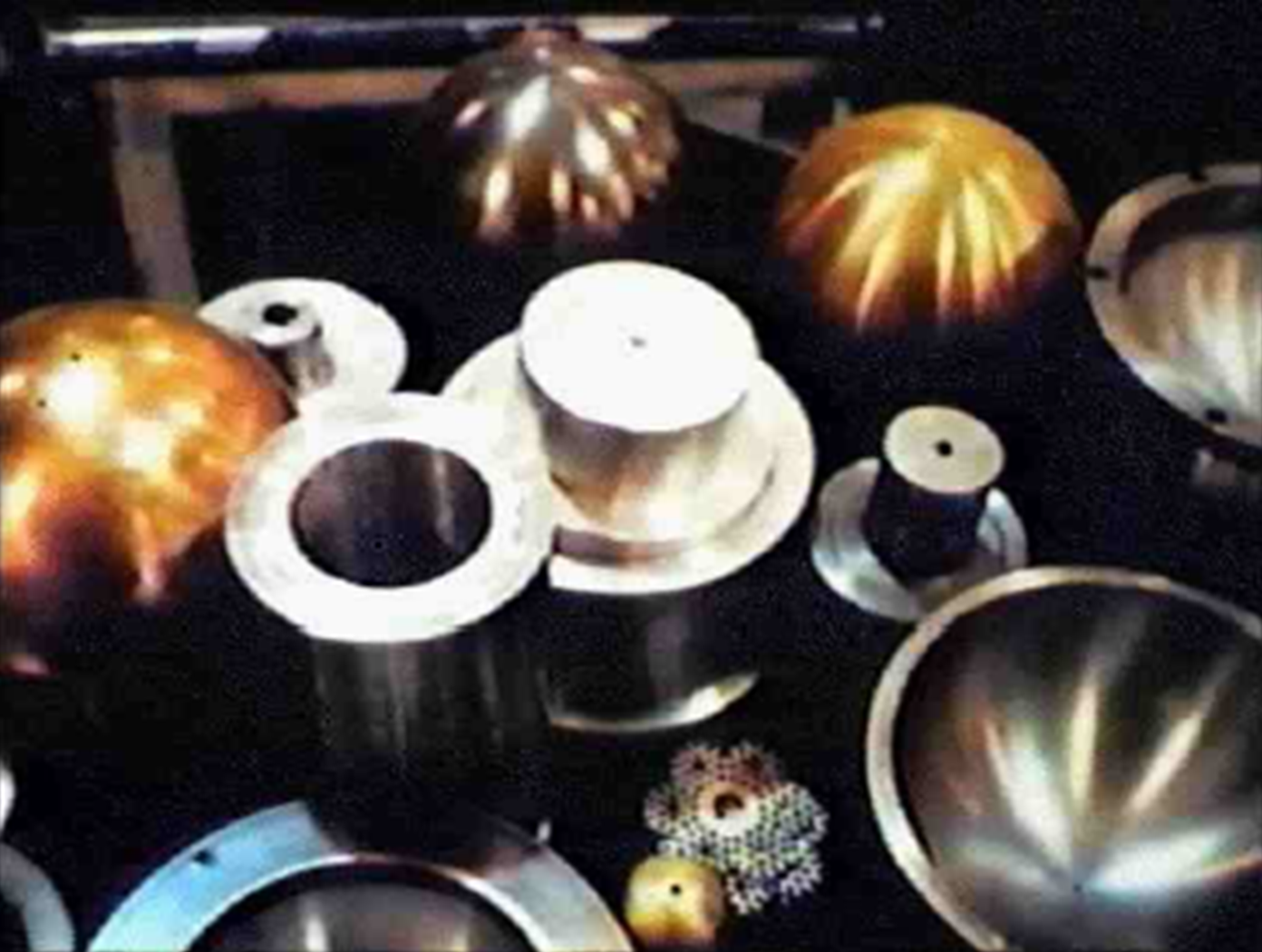
Internal nuclear components of the B61 bomb. The bomb was assembled at the Burlington AEC Plant and Pantex.

A Sandia document on the dates of the development phases of the US nuclear stockpile describes the B61-3 as an "improved Mod 2 w/IHE" and the B61-4 as "same as Mod 3 ex. Hi-Y".

The B61 Mod 3 and 4 bombs do not contain beryllium.

=== B61 Mod 5 ===
A 1978 report on reducing or substituting beryllium in nuclear weapons noted that the B61-5 contained beryllium and that if the use of beryllium were to be restricted, the B61-5 could probably be replaced by the B61 Mod 3.

=== B61 Mod 6 and 8 ===
The B61 Mod 6 and Mod 8 bombs were developed for use by the US Navy beginning in March 1987 and cancelled at the end of the Cold War. The weapons weighed 770 pounds (350 kg), had a length of 141.6 inches (3,597 mm) and a diameter of 13.3 inches (338 mm), and were one-point safe, used insensitive high explosives (IHE) in their primary stages and used enhanced electrical safety (EES).

The weapons were to be built by converting existing B61-0, −2 and −5 weapons into Mod 6 and 8 weapons and the weapons were to use B61-7 weapon parts where possible. By mass, the largest deviations from the B61-7 were the Acorn assembly, MC4137 TSSG (trajectory sensing signal generator) and the JTA (described as "ballast for WR").

==== Electrical systems ====
The weapon's computer was the MC4139 Programmer, two of which are used on independent channels, and is identical to the programmer used on the B61-7. The MC3656 Main Battery is identical to the battery used on the B61-7 and is thermally operated, providing 120 seconds of power for the weapon, but initial power is supplied by the MC2238 Pulse Batteries which are activated by the weapon's pullout switches during separation from the aircraft.

The weapon contained two neutron generators for initiation, using a 2400-volt 0.6 μF capacitor for neutron generator firing and a 3300-volt 2.0 μF capacitor for the firing set. If neither the radar fuze or the contact crystals actuated, the weapon would detonate at 120 seconds from arming.

The weapons were to initially use the MC4175 Trajectory Sensing Signal Generators which are identical to the TSSG found in the B61-7, but starting from 1991, the Mod 6 was to get a new MC4137 Trajectory Sensing Signal Generator. The MC4175 stored the arming signal for the trajectory stronglink in its memory, so it featured a pair of rolamite acceleration switches designed to prevent the possibility of the signal being transferred to the stronglink before the rolamites were actuated by the spinning of the weapon in flight. The MC4137 instead is provided the unique signal from the MC4139 Programmer, which stores it in a volatile memory that erases after approximately seven seconds of lost power, meaning that without intent from the MC4139 and continuously applied power the MC4137 does not know how to arm the safelink.

==== Stronglink switches and weaklinks ====
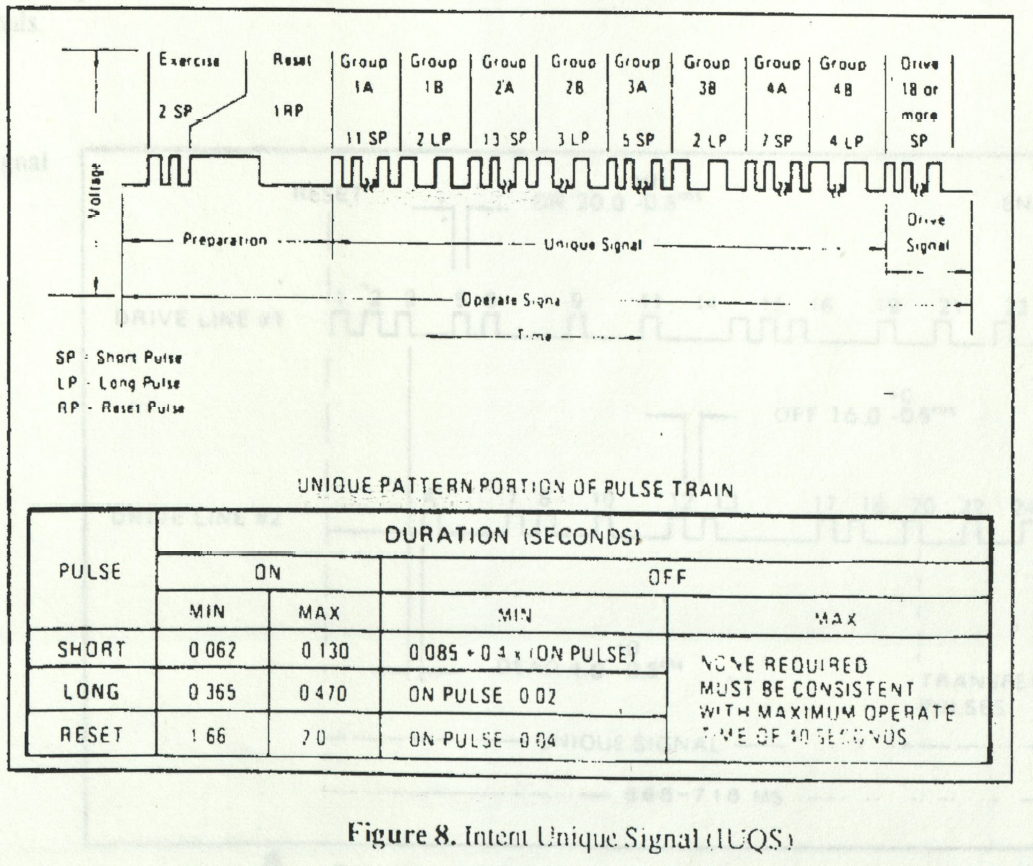
IUQS for MC2969 Intent Stronglink Switch

The weapon was to feature a number of weapon stronglinks. Stronglinks are part of the weapon's safety systems and are designed to be robust enough that they can survive abnormal environments long enough for the weapon's weaklinks to fail. This requires weak and stronglinks to be colocated so they are exposed to the same environmental conditions in an accident.

The first stronglink was the MC2969 Intent Stronglink Switch which was also used on the B61-3, −4 and −7, W78, W80 and B83 weapons. The MC2969 consisted of a 14-pin ceramic-insulated bank of switches that would close upon the receipt of the proper intent unique signal (IUQS) to its electromechanical decoder. Receipt of the wrong signal would lock the MC2969 in the open position until a specific unlock signal was received.

The second stronglink was the MC2935 Trajectory Stronglink Switch of which there were two, one for each channel of the weapon's firing set. Like the MC2969, it mechanically locked if it received the wrong input signals, but unlike the MC2969 it could only be manually unlocked, which could only take place at the factory. Signals for the MC2935 come from either of the two MC4175s or the MC4137 Trajectory Sensing Signal Generators.

A third stronglink existed inside the first exclusion region of the weapon and was involved in weapon arming. Details of the system are still classified.

=== B61 Mod 12 ===
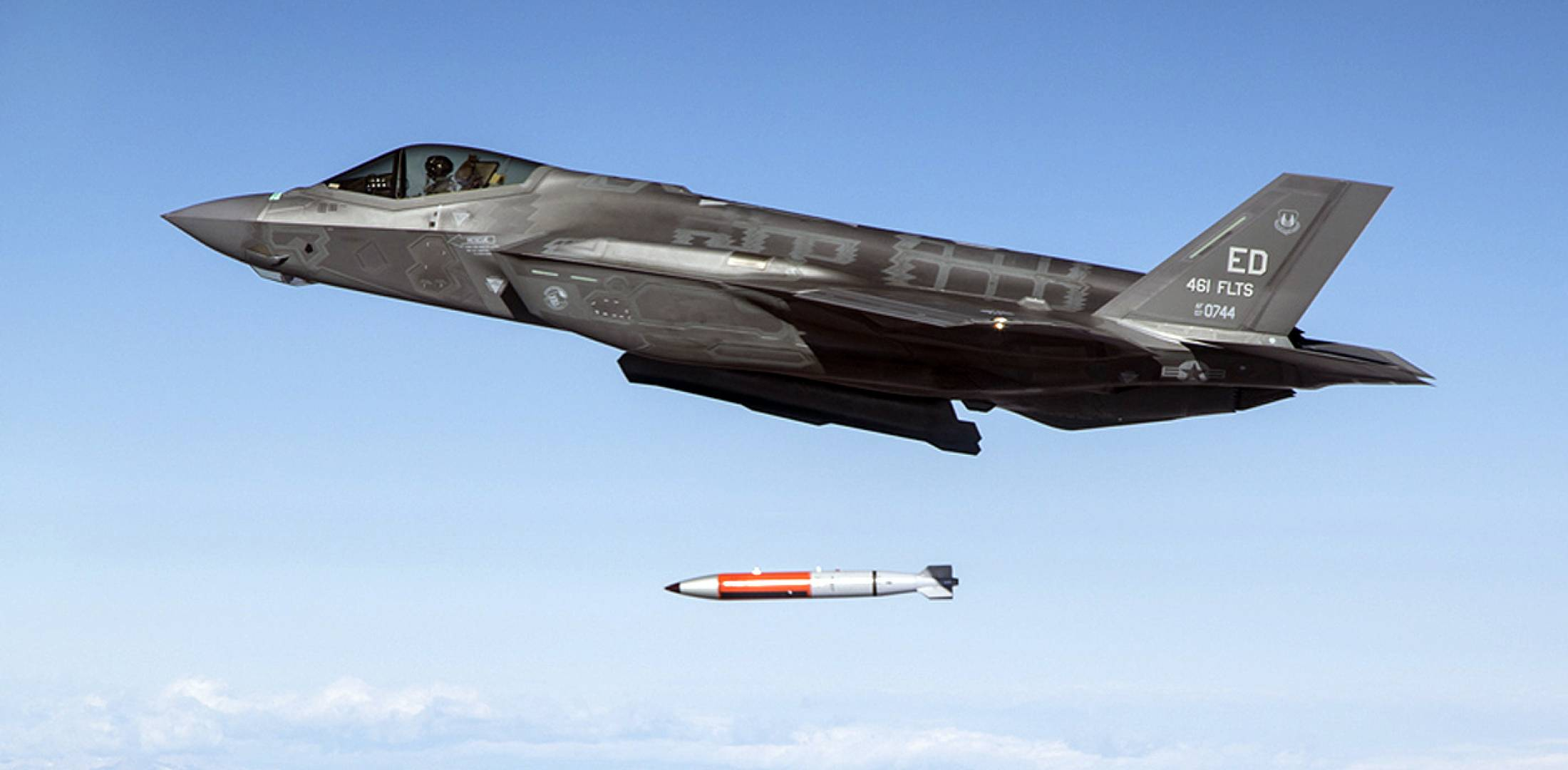
B61 Mod 12 test

As of 2013, the Pentagon saw the B83 nuclear bomb as a "relic of the Cold War," believing that deploying a megaton-yield gravity bomb, the highest level nuclear weapon left in the US inventory, to Europe was "inconceivable" at this point. It can also only be carried by the B-2 bomber, and integrating it onto additional aircraft would be costly. The Mod 12 upgrade is being pursued as a forward-deployed tactical/strategic nuclear weapon to protect NATO and Asian allies since it can be used from dual-capable fighter aircraft, as well as planned to arm the F-35 and B-21 Raider, and its lower yield options make it more flexible with less collateral effects. Recapitalizing the B61 is hoped to lead to the retirement of the B83, resulting in the elimination of the last megaton-yield US bomb and leave the B61-series as the only US gravity nuclear bomb.

In 2013, the Pentagon and NNSA stated that if B61 refurbishment did not begin by 2019, components in the existing weapons could begin to fail. In 2013 Tom Collina of the Arms Control Association said that the new development could complicate arms control efforts with Russia.

In 2014, Congress slashed funding for the project and called for alternates to be studied. In January 2014, former Air Force Chief of Staff Norton A. Schwartz stated that the Mod 12 nuclear bomb upgrade would have enhanced accuracy and a lower yield with less fallout compared to previous versions of the weapon. Accuracy has not been a guarantee for air-dropped nuclear weapons, so consequently large warheads were needed to effectively impact a target; the Mod 11 nuclear earth-penetrator is accurate to 360 to 560 feet (110 to 170 m) from the desired detonation location, so it requires a 400-kiloton warhead. The Mod 12 is accurate to 100 feet (30 m) from a target and only requires a 50-kiloton warhead. Schwartz believes that greater accuracy would both improve the weapon and create a different target set it can be useful against. An example is the higher-yield Mod 11's role of attacking underground bunkers that need a ground burst to create a crater and destroy it through the shockwave. A 50-kiloton yield detonating on the ground produces a crater with a radius of 100 to 220 feet (30 to 68 m), depending on the density of the surface, effectively putting the bunker within the circular error probability.

In 2014, critics said that a more accurate and less destructive nuclear weapon would make leaders less cautious about deploying it, while Schwartz said it would deter adversaries more because the US would be more willing to use it in situations where necessary. The improved accuracy would make it more effective than the previous Mod 3/4 currently deployed to the continent. F-16 and Panavia Tornado aircraft cannot interface with the new bomb due to electronic differences, but NATO countries buying the F-35 would be able to use it. The first flight test for an inert Mod 12 was conducted in 2015, with a second successful test in August 2017.

Despite claims the Mod 12 has an earth penetrating capability, the weapon does not have the reinforced structure like that of the Mod 11, which is required to function as an earth penetrating weapon. The Mod 11 will be retained in service for the ground penetrating mission.

The Mod 12 Life Extension Program continued in 2018 and on 29 June 2018 two successful non-nuclear system qualification flight tests at Tonopah Test Range were reported. In October 2018, the Mod 12 guided tail-kit assembly received Milestone C approval to enter the production phase; the TKA went through the traditional test program in under 11 months, achieving a 100% success rate for all 31 bomb drops. The B61-12 nuclear bomb completed its successful flight tests with the US Air Force's F-15E in June 2020. It was dropped from above 25,000 ft (7,600 m) and was in the air for approximately 55 seconds before hitting the target.

The first B61-12 bomb was produced in November 2021. The weapon replaces the B61 mod 3, mod 4 and mod 7 bombs while the B61-11 will be retained in the stockpile. It is expected that the LEP will extend the B61's life by at least 20 years. In October 2022, it was announced that the US military planned to accelerate the deployment of the Mod 12 in Europe. This drew criticism from the Russian Deputy Minister of Foreign Affairs Alexander Grushko, who accused the US government of "reducing the nuclear threshold" with the weapon's increased accuracy.

The F/A-18E/F Super Hornet is not listed as a future platform.

=== B61 Mod 13 ===
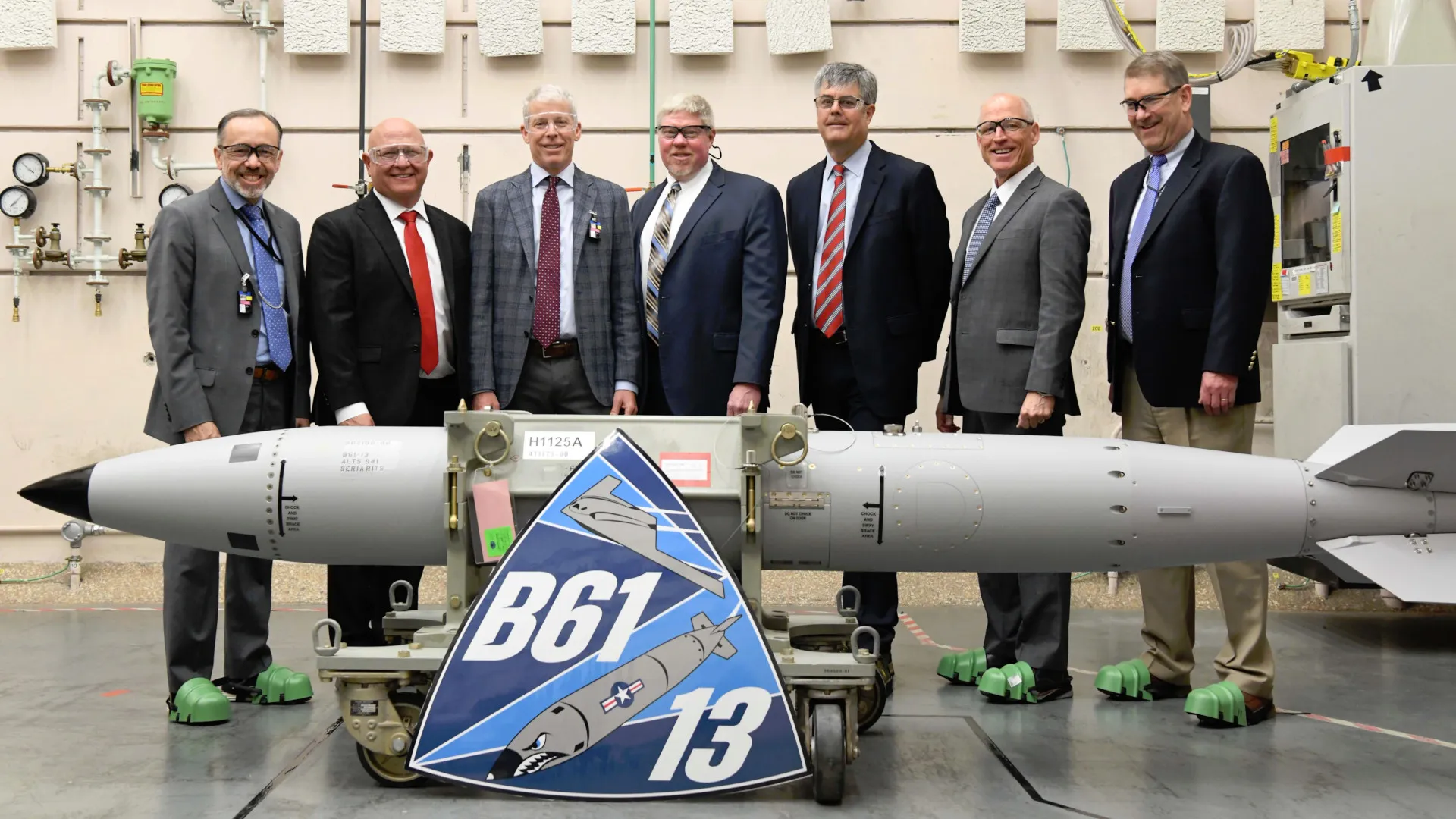
First production B61-13 in May 2025

Initially, the NNSA Stockpile Stewardship and Management Plan anticipated Phase 1 development for the B61 Mod 13 Life Extension Program (LEP) beginning in 2037 with first production of the weapon in 2050, but in 2023 plans were announced to produce a new gravity bomb similar to that of the B61-12, but having a high yield similar to that of the B61-7, named the B61 Mod 13. This discards plans for the Mod 13 to be a future Mod 12 LEP. It is planned that for each B61-13 produced, one fewer B61-12 is to be produced, therefore not increasing the planned number of new B61 bombs; defense officials indicated only "a few dozen" B61-13s may be produced. The new bomb will be carried by the B-21 Raider, but it is not planned to be deployed on the F-35.

The Federation of American Scientists have accused the weapon of being a "political bomb", introduced to finally retire the B83-1 nuclear bomb, whose retirement has been blocked by hardliners.

The first B61-13 was completed in May 2025.

=== W61 Earth Penetrator Warhead ===
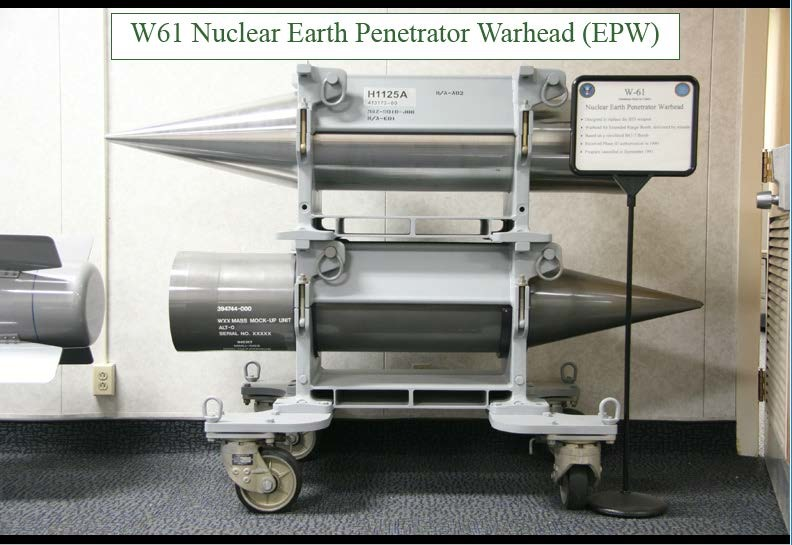
W61 Nuclear Earth Penetrator Warhead

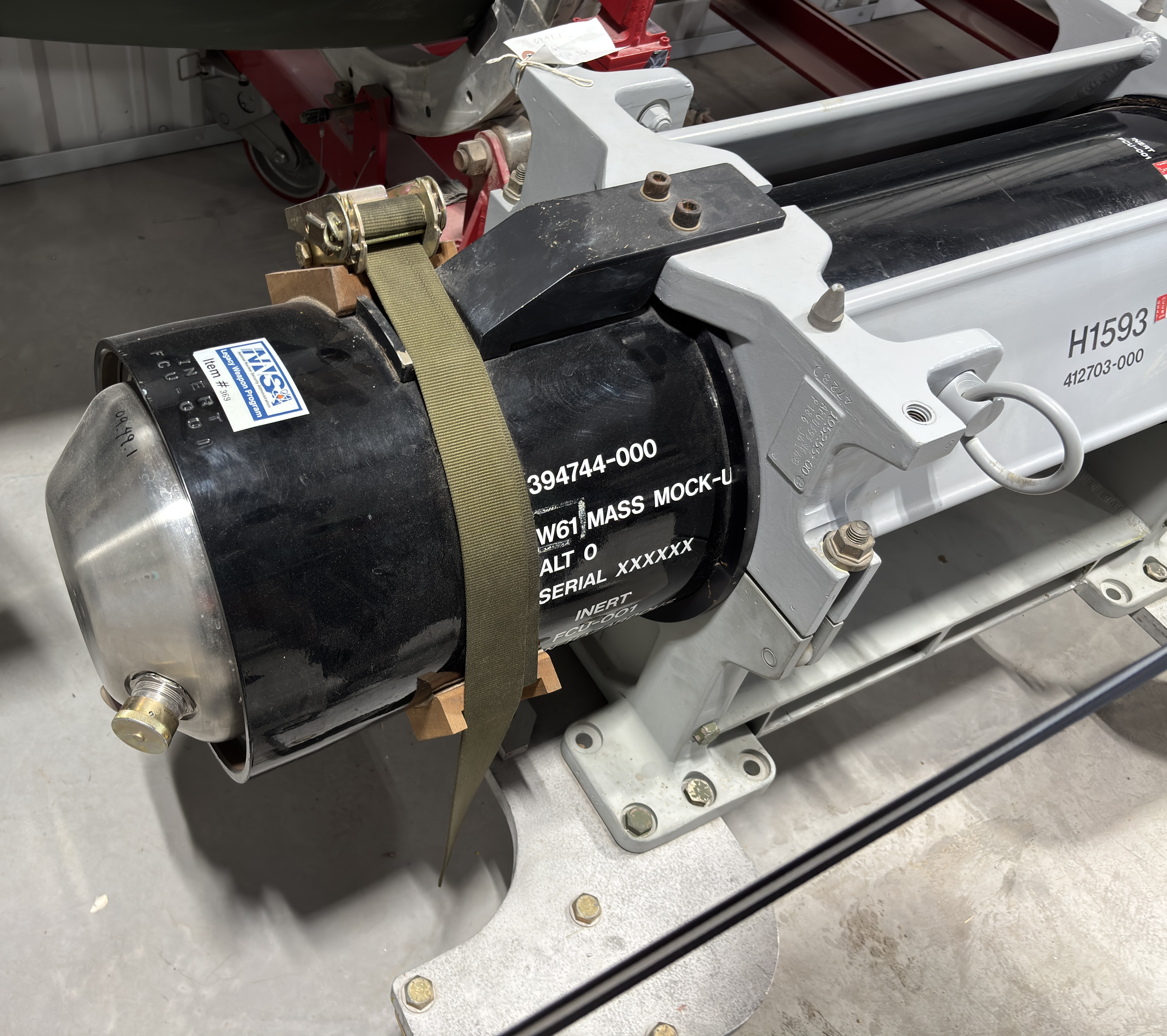
Aft view of mass mock of canceled W61 warhead showing pressure valves; on display at the National Museum of Nuclear Science and History.

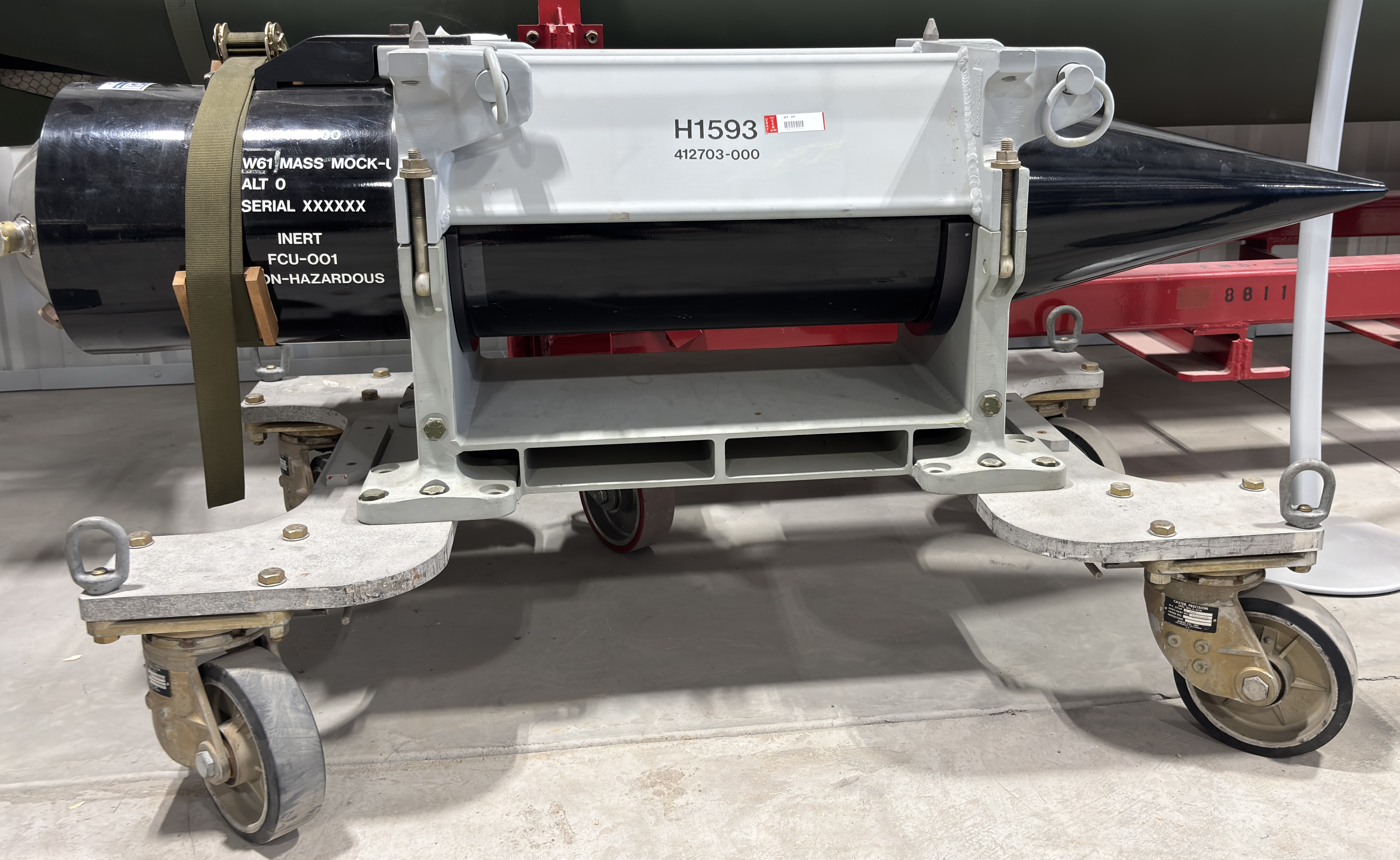
A mass mock of the canceled W61 earth piercing nuclear weapon on display at the National Museum of Nuclear Science and History.

A W61 Earth Penetrator Warhead (EPW) with a yield of 340 kilotons was developed for the AGM-129 Advanced Cruise Missile and the MGM-134 Midgetman small ICBM. The weapon entered Phase 1 initial development in January 1985 and phase 4 production engineering in September 1992 before being cancelled in December of that year.

In the Advanced Cruise Missile role, the weapon was to replace aging B53 bombs, but after the W61 cancellation the role was filled by the B61-11 bomb.

=== Pits ===
A declassified technical report on the automation of pit handling at Pantex indicates that the B61-2 and B61-5 share a common pit design, as do the B61-3, B61-10 and W85. The B61-0 and B61-4 do not share a pit with any other weapon. As the B61-7 was a retrofit of the B61-1 and the B61-11 was a retrofit of the B61-7, they presumably share a common pit.

== Cost ==
In May 2010, the National Nuclear Security Administration asked Congress for $40 million to redesign the bomb to enable the Lockheed Martin F-35 Lightning II to carry the weapon internally by 2017. This version is designated Mod 12. The four hundred Mod 12 bombs will be used by both tactical aircraft (such as the F-35) and strategic aircraft (such as the B-2) and the Tail Subassembly (TSA) will give them Joint Direct Attack Munition levels of accuracy, allowing the fifty kiloton warhead to have strategic effects from all carrying aircraft. However, refitting the 400 weapons is now expected to cost over $10 billion. The Mod 12 tail assembly contract was awarded to Boeing on November 27, 2012 for $178 million. Boeing will use their experience with the Joint Direct Attack Munition to yield JDAM-equivalent accuracy in a nuclear bomb. This contract is only the first part of the billion-dollar expense of producing and applying the tail kits, over and above the $10 billion cost to refurbish the warheads. The Mod 12 uses an internal guidance system and can glide to its target. On 1 July 2015, the National Nuclear Security Administration (NNSA) conducted the first of three flight tests of the Mod 12 tail kit assembly.

According to the Federation of American Scientists in 2012, the roughly 400 B61-12s will cost $28 million each.

== See also ==
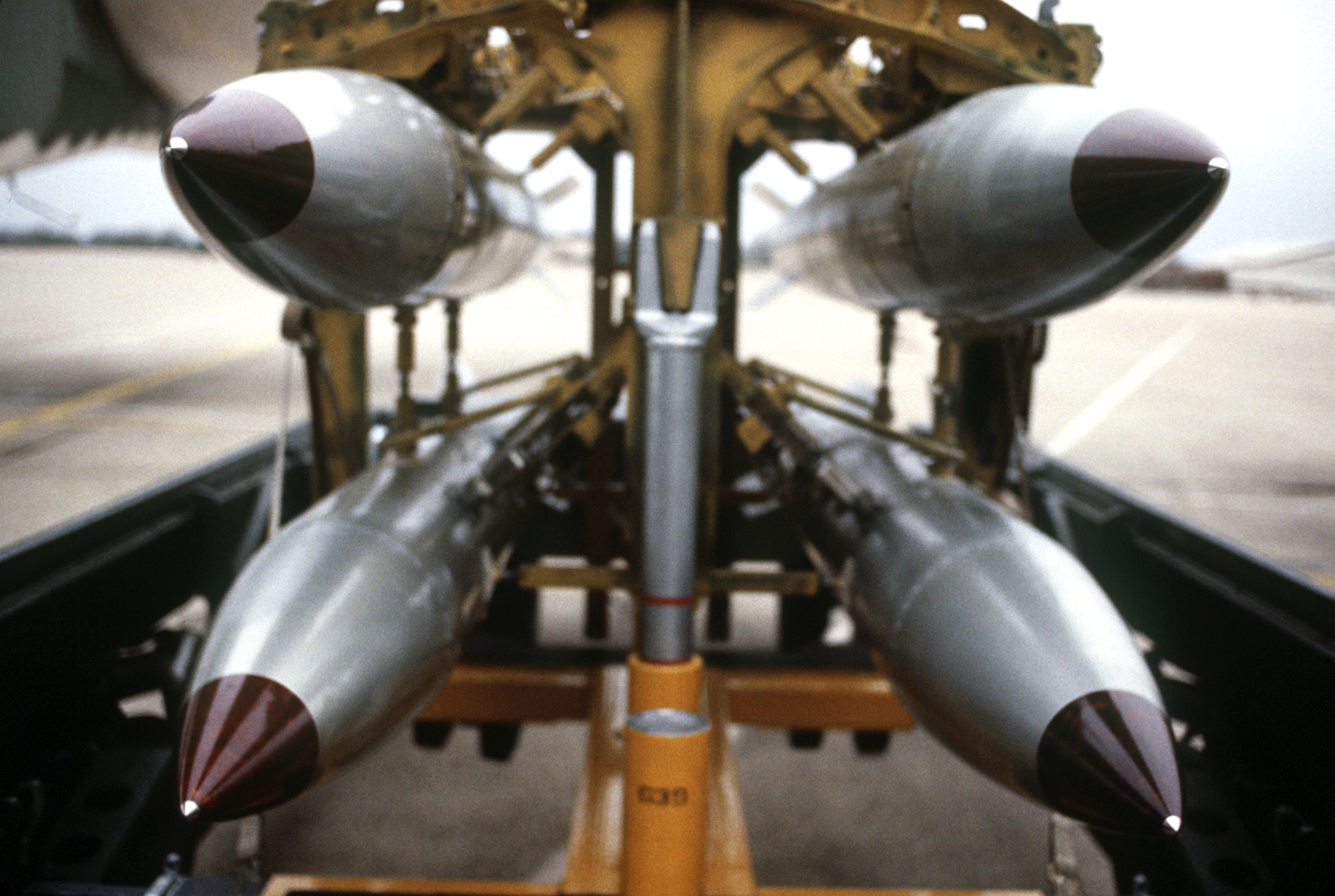
B61s on a bomb rack

- B61 Family
- List of nuclear weapons
- WE.177
- Weapons Storage and Security System
