= Renovation of the nuclear weapon arsenal of the United States =

Military program

The renovation of the nuclear weapon arsenal of the United States is the modernization, refurbishment and rebuilding of the nuclear arsenal of the United States of America.

Facilities for maintenance and refurbishment of U.S. nuclear weapons allegedly became dilapidated after the end of the Cold War with the Soviet Union. The United States planned to spend about a trillion dollars over thirty years to rectify this shortfall, which some saw as a reversal from President Barack Obama's 2009 Prague speech that laid out his agenda for further nuclear disarmament, for which he won the Nobel Peace Prize in 2009. In 2015, the Bulletin of the Atomic Scientists set its Doomsday Clock closer to midnight to highlight this development.

== Budget projection ==
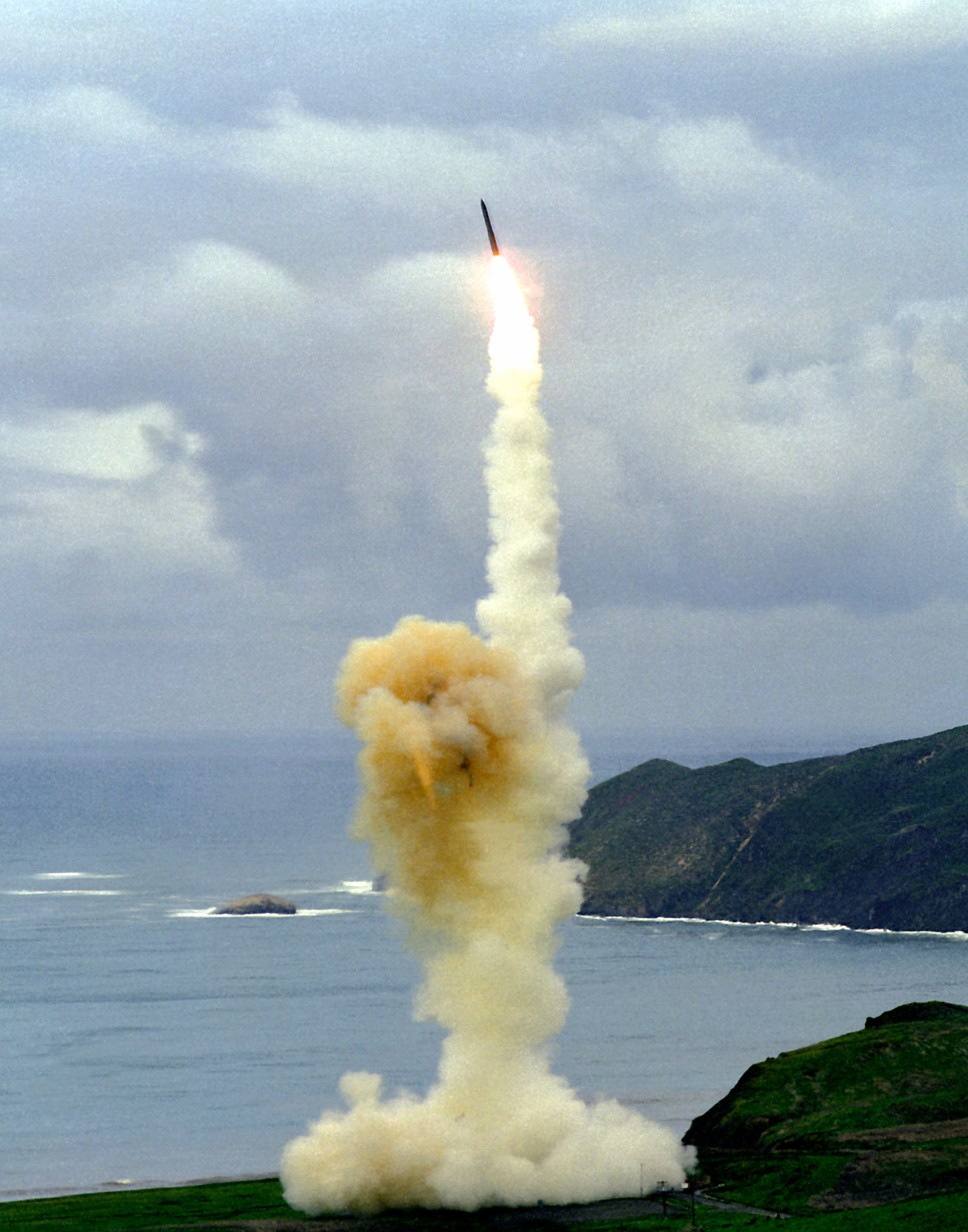
Test launch of a Minuteman III missile

Analysts at the Monterey Institute of International Studies have projected likely expenditure on the program, based upon section 1251 of the National Defense Authorization Act for Fiscal Year 2010 and other official briefings. Their summary breaks down the 30 year budget in billions of dollars as follows:

- 350 for the National Nuclear Security Administration which runs the facilities which research, develop and produce nuclear weapons
- 240 to 270 for maintenance of the existing triad of bombers, land-based missiles and submarine-launched missiles
- 120 for command, control and communications
- 20 to 120 for a successor to the Minuteman missile.
- 77 to 102 for Ohio-class submarines to carry missiles
- 55 to 100 for a new strategic bomber to succeed the B2
- 10 to 20 for a Long Range Stand Off Weapon LRSO standoff missile

making a total of $872 billion to $1.082 trillion. $348 billion have already been committed for the first ten years of the program.

In 2017, the Congressional Budget Office produced a report analysing the planned expenditure and its estimate of the total cost over 30 years was $1.2 trillion. This was before any additional capacity which might result from the Nuclear Posture Review of the Trump administration, which was expected to be completed in early 2018.

== Facilities ==
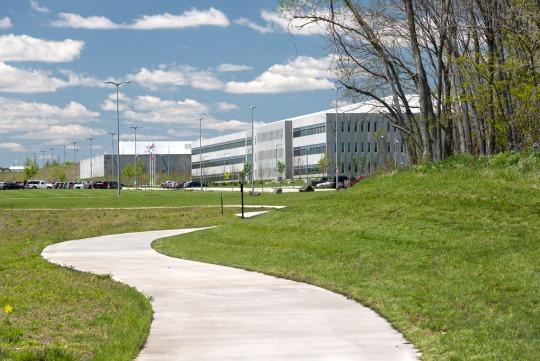
The new National Security Campus was opened in 2014 to replace the older site of the Kansas City Plant. Their main program is to extend the life of the W76 warhead.

The main facilities of the National Nuclear Security Administration are:

1. The administrative headquarters known as the John A. Gordon Albuquerque Complex at Kirtland Air Force Base
2. Lawrence Livermore National Laboratory in California which researches plutonium and houses the National Ignition Facility
3. Los Alamos National Laboratory in New Mexico which researches and runs computer simulations
4. The National Security Campus at Kansas City, which produces non-nuclear components of the weapons
5. Nevada National Security Site where nuclear weapons are tested
6. The Pantex Plant in Texas which assembles and disassembles nuclear weapons
7. Sandia National Laboratories in New Mexico, which stress-tests and strain measurements on the nuclear weapons
8. The Savannah River Site in South Carolina which processes waste and produces tritium
9. The Y-12 National Security Complex in Oak Ridge, Tennessee where uranium is enriched and processed

=== National Security Campus ===
The old facility in Kansas City was originally an aero-engine plant which was converted to make components for nuclear weapons in 1949. After 50 years, it had become decrepit and was regularly flooded by a river. A replacement plant was opened on higher ground nearby in 2014 at a cost of $700 million. Equipment was transferred from the old plant including 30,000 crates and an 87,000 pound milling machine. The new facility is cleaner and more modern and will have lower running costs than the old one. Its main task now is to triple the life of the W76 warheads used on submarine-launched ballistic missiles from the original 20 years to 60 years.

=== Sandia ===
The Z machine at Sandia which is used to simulate a thermonuclear device.

The Sandia National Laboratories tests nuclear weapons to ensure they can withstand extreme physical stress such as missile launch and re-entry. Their testing equipment includes centrifuges, a pulsed power system, a rocket sled, six-inch cannon and wind tunnel. A major overhaul of these was completed in 2014, at a cost of about $100 million.

== Doomsday clock ==
In January 2015, the Bulletin of the Atomic Scientists set their Doomsday Clock at three minutes to midnight. Their executive director, Kennette Benedict, announced that the world was closer to catastrophe as "unchecked climate change and a nuclear arms race resulting from modernization of huge arsenals pose extraordinary and undeniable threats to the continued existence of humanity."

== See also ==
- Prompt Global Strike — the US capability to make a conventional attack anywhere in the world within an hour.
- Reliable Replacement Warhead — a family of new nuclear weapons which started development at the NNSA in 2004 but which was cancelled in 2009.
- Stockpile stewardship
