= Nuclear bunker buster =

Earth-penetrating nuclear weapon

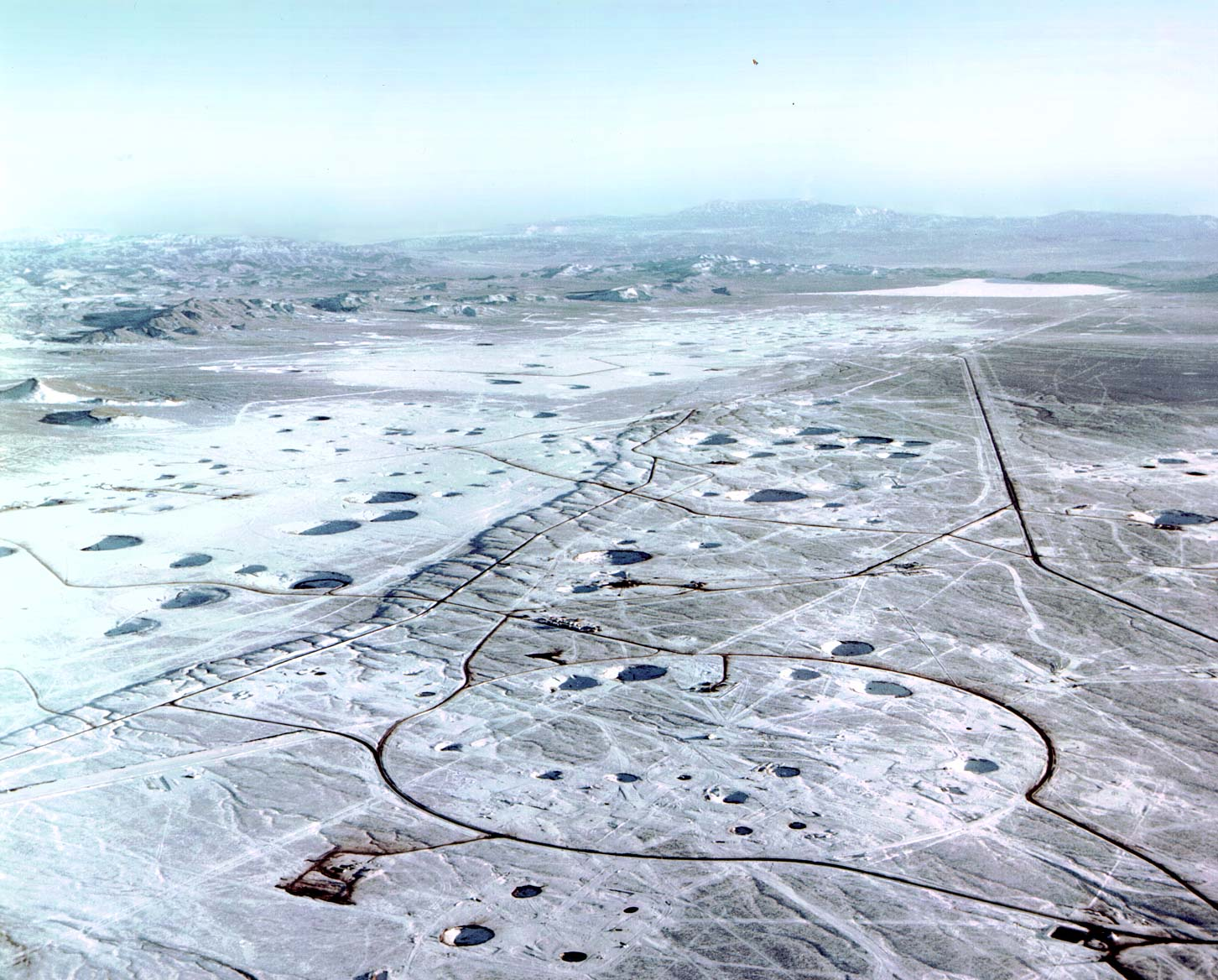
Subsidence craters remaining after underground nuclear (test) explosions at the north end of the Yucca Flat, Nevada, test site

A nuclear bunker buster, also known as an earth-penetrating weapon (EPW), are nuclear weapons designed against hard and deeply buried targets that conventional bunker busters cannot destroy. The non-nuclear component of the weapon is designed to penetrate soil, rock, or concrete to deliver a nuclear warhead to an underground target. These weapons would be used to destroy hardened, underground military bunkers or other below-ground facilities. An underground explosion releases a larger fraction of its energy into the ground, compared to a surface burst or air burst explosion at or above the surface, and so can destroy an underground target using a lower explosive yield. This in turn could lead to a reduced amount of radioactive fallout. However, it is unlikely that the explosion would be completely contained underground. As a result, significant amounts of rock and soil would be rendered radioactive and lofted as dust or vapor into the atmosphere, generating significant fallout.

== Base principle ==
While conventional bunker busters use several methods to penetrate concrete structures, these are for the purpose of destroying the structure directly, and are generally limited in how much of a bunker (or system of bunkers) they can destroy by depth and their relatively low explosive force (compared to nuclear weapons).

The primary difference between conventional and nuclear bunker busters is that, while the conventional version is meant for one target, the nuclear version can destroy an entire underground bunker system.

The main principles in modern bunker design are largely centered around survivability in nuclear war. As a result of this both American and Soviet sites reached a state of "super hardening", involving defenses against the effects of a nuclear weapon such as spring- or counterweight-mounted (in the case of the R-36) control capsules and thick concrete walls (3 to 4 feet (0.9 to 1.2 m) for the Minuteman ICBM launch control capsule) heavily reinforced with rebar. These systems were designed to survive a near miss of 20 megatons.

Liquid-fueled missiles such as those historically used by Russia are more fragile and easily damaged than solid-fueled missiles such as those used by the United States. The complex fuel storage facilities and equipment needed to fuel missiles for launch and de-fuel them for frequent maintenance add additional weaknesses and vulnerabilities. Therefore, a similar degree of silo "hardening" does not automatically equate to a similar level of missile "survivability".

Major advancements in the accuracy and precision of nuclear and conventional weapons subsequent to the invention of the missile silo itself have also rendered many "hardening" technologies useless. With modern weapons capable of striking within several feet of their intended targets, a modern "near miss" can be much more effective than a "hit" decades ago. A weapon need only cover the silo door with sufficient debris to prevent its immediate opening to render the missile inside useless for its intended mission of rapid strike or counter-strike deployment.

A nuclear bunker buster negates most of the countermeasures involved in the protection of underground bunkers by penetrating the defenses prior to detonating. A relatively low yield may be able to produce seismic forces beyond those of an air burst or even ground burst of a weapon with twice its yield. Additionally, the weapon has the ability to impart more severe horizontal shock waves than many bunker systems are designed to combat by detonating at or near the bunker's depth, rather than above it.

Geologic factors also play a major role in weapon effectiveness and facility survivability. Locating facilities in hard rock may appear to reduce the effectiveness of bunker-buster type weapons by decreasing penetration, but the hard rock also transmits shock forces to a far higher degree than softer soil types. The difficulties of drilling into and constructing facilities within hard rock also increase construction time and expense, as well as making it more likely construction will be discovered and new sites targeted by foreign militaries.

== Methods of operation ==
=== Penetration by explosive force ===
Concrete structure design has not changed significantly in the last 70 years. The majority of protected concrete structures in the US military are derived from standards set forth in Fundamentals of Protective Design, published in 1946 (US Army Corps of Engineers). Various augmentations, such as glass, fibers, and rebar, have made concrete less vulnerable, but far from impenetrable.

When explosive force is applied to concrete, three major fracture regions are usually formed: the initial crater, a crushed aggregate surrounding the crater, and "scabbing" on the surface opposite the crater. Scabbing, also known as spalling, is the violent separation of a mass of material from the opposite face of a plate or slab subjected to an impact or impulsive loading, without necessarily requiring that the barrier itself be penetrated.

While soil is a less dense material, it also does not transmit shock waves as well as concrete. So while a penetrator may actually travel further through soil, its effect may be lessened due to its inability to transmit shock to the target.

=== Hardened penetrator ===
A secant ogive

Further thinking on the subject envisions a hardened penetrator using kinetic energy to defeat the target's defenses and subsequently deliver a nuclear explosive to the buried target.

The primary difficulty facing the designers of such a penetrator is the tremendous heat applied to the penetrator when striking the shielding at high speed. This has partially been solved by using metals such as tungsten (the metal with the highest melting point), and altering the shape of the projectile (such as an ogive).

Altering the shape of the projectile to incorporate an ogive shape has yielded substantial improvement in penetration ability. Rocket sled testing at Eglin Air Force Base has demonstrated penetrations of 100 to 150 feet (30 to 46 m) in concrete when traveling at 4,000 ft/s (1,200 m/s). The reason for this is liquefaction of the concrete in the target, which tends to flow over the projectile. Variation in the speed of the penetrator can either cause it to be vaporized on impact (in the case of traveling too fast), or to not penetrate far enough (in the case of traveling too slowly). An approximation for the penetration depth is obtained with an impact depth formula derived by Sir Isaac Newton.

=== Combination penetrator-explosive munitions ===
Another school of thought on nuclear bunker busters is using a light penetrator to travel 50 to 100 feet (15 to 30 m) through shielding, and detonate a nuclear charge there. Such an explosion would generate powerful shock waves, which would be transmitted very effectively through the solid material comprising the shielding (see "scabbing" above).

== Policy and criticism of fallout ==
The main criticisms of nuclear bunker busters regard fallout and nuclear proliferation. The purpose of an earth-penetrating nuclear bunker buster is to reduce the required yield needed to ensure the destruction of the target by coupling the explosion to the ground, yielding a shock wave similar to an earthquake. For example, the United States retired the B-53 warhead, with a yield of nine megatons, because the B-61 Mod 11 could attack similar targets with much lower yield (400 kilotons), due to the latter's superior ground penetration. By burying itself into the ground before detonation, a much higher proportion of the explosion energy is transferred to seismic shock when compared to the surface burst produced from the B-53's laydown delivery. Moreover, the globally dispersed fallout of an underground B-61 Mod 11 would likely be less than that of a surface burst B-53. Supporters note that this is one of the reasons nuclear bunker busters should be developed. Critics claim that developing new nuclear weapons sends a proliferating message to non-nuclear powers, undermining non-proliferation efforts.

Critics also worry that the existence of lower-yield nuclear weapons for relatively limited tactical purposes will lower the threshold for their actual use, thus blurring the sharp line between conventional weapons intended for use and weapons of mass destruction intended only for hypothetical deterrence, and increasing the risk of escalation to higher-yield nuclear weapons.

Local fallout from any nuclear detonation is increased with proximity to the ground. While a megaton-class yield surface burst will inevitably throw up many tons of (newly) radioactive debris, which falls back to the earth as fallout, critics contend that despite their relatively minuscule explosive yield, nuclear bunker busters create more local fallout per kiloton yield. Also, because of the subsurface detonation, radioactive debris may contaminate the local groundwater.

The Union of Concerned Scientists advocacy group points out that at the Nevada Test Site, the depth required to contain fallout from an average-yield underground nuclear test was over 300 feet (100 m), depending upon the weapon's yield. They contend that it is improbable that penetrators could be made to burrow so deeply. With yields between 0.3 and 340 kilotons, they argue, it is unlikely the blast would be completely contained.

Critics further state that the testing of new nuclear weapons would be prohibited by the proposed Comprehensive Test Ban Treaty. Although Congress refused to ratify the CTBT in 1999, and therefore this treaty has no legal force in the US, the US has adhered to the spirit of the treaty by maintaining a moratorium on nuclear testing since 1992.

Proponents, however, contend that lower explosive yield devices and subsurface bursts would produce little to no climatic effects in the event of a nuclear war, in contrast to multi-megaton air and surface bursts (that is, if the nuclear winter hypothesis proves accurate). Lower fuzing heights, which would result from partially buried warheads, would limit or completely obstruct the range of the burning thermal rays of a nuclear detonation, therefore limiting the target, and its surroundings, to a fire hazard by reducing the range of thermal radiation with fuzing for subsurface bursts. Professors Altfeld and Cimbala have suggested that belief in the possibility of nuclear winter has actually made nuclear war more likely, contrary to the views of Carl Sagan and others, because it has inspired the development of more accurate, and lower explosive yield, nuclear weapons.

== Targets and the development of bunker busters ==
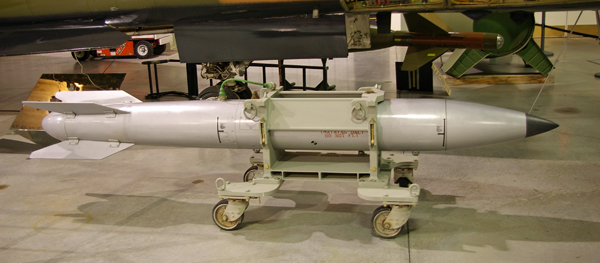
B61 nuclear bomb

As early as 1944, the Barnes Wallis Tallboy bomb and subsequent Grand Slam weapons were designed to penetrate deeply fortified structures through sheer explosive power. These were not designed to directly penetrate defences, though they could do this (for example, the Valentin submarine pens had ferrous concrete roofs 15 feet (4.5 m) thick which were penetrated by two Grand Slams on 27 March 1945), but rather to penetrate under the target and explode leaving a camouflet (cavern) which would undermine foundations of structures above, causing it to collapse, thus negating any possible hardening. The destruction of targets such as the V3 battery at Mimoyecques was the first operational use of the Tallboy. One bored through a hillside and exploded in the Saumur rail tunnel about 60 feet (18 m) below, completely blocking it, and showing that these weapons could destroy any hardened or deeply excavated installation. Modern targeting techniques allied with multiple strikes could perform a similar task.

Development continued, with weapons such as the nuclear B61, and conventional thermobaric weapons and GBU-28. One of the more effective housings, the GBU-28 used its large mass (4,700 lb or 2,130 kg) and casing (constructed from barrels of surplus 203 mm howitzers) to penetrate 20 feet (6 metres) of concrete, and more than 100 feet (30 m) of earth. The B61 Mod 11, which first entered military service after the Cold war had ended, in January 1997, was specifically developed to allow for bunker penetration, and is speculated to have the ability to destroy hardened targets a few hundred feet beneath the earth.

While penetrations of 20 to 100 feet (6 to 30 m) were sufficient for some shallow targets, both the Soviet Union and the United States were creating bunkers buried under huge volumes of soil or reinforced concrete in order to withstand the multi-megaton thermonuclear weapons developed in the 1950s and 1960s. Bunker penetration weapons were initially designed within this Cold War context. One likely Soviet Union/Russian target, Mount Yamantau, was regarded in the 1990s by Maryland Republican congressman, Roscoe Bartlett, as capable of surviving "half a dozen" repeated nuclear strikes of an unspecified yield, one after the other in a "direct hole".

The Russian continuity of government facility at Kosvinsky Mountain, finished in early 1996, was designed to resist US earth-penetrating warheads and serves a similar role as the American Cheyenne Mountain Complex. The timing of the Kosvinsky completion date is regarded as one explanation for US interest in a new nuclear bunker buster and the declaration of the deployment of the B-61 Mod 11 in 1997. Kosvinsky is protected by about 1,000 feet (300 m) of granite.

The weapon was maintained in U.S. stockpiles after the Cold War during the 2001 US invasion of Afghanistan, and again during the 2003 invasion of Iraq. During the campaign in Tora Bora in particular, the United States believed that "vast underground complexes," deeply buried, were protecting opposing forces. Such complexes were not found. While a nuclear penetrator (the "Robust Nuclear Earth Penetrator", or "RNEP") was never built, the US DOE was allotted budget to develop it, and tests were conducted by the US Air Force Research Laboratory. The RNEP was to use the 1.2 megaton B83 physics package. The United States also continued to develop new conventional bunker buster munitions.

The Bush administration removed its request for funding of the weapon in October 2005. Additionally, then US Senator Pete Domenici announced funding for the nuclear bunker-buster has been dropped from the US Department of Energy's 2006 budget at the department's request.

While the project for the RNEP seems to be in fact canceled, Jane's Information Group speculated in 2005 that work might continue under another name.

== Notable U.S. nuclear bunker busters ==
The B83-1 and B-61 Mod 11 and 13 are the nuclear bunker busters remaining in U.S. stockpiles. The B83-1 is slated for retirement. Air Force budget documents suggest a new nuclear bunker buster is in development.

Note that with the exception of strictly earth penetrating weapons, others were designed with air burst capability and some were depth charges as well.

- Mark 8 nuclear bomb (1952–1957): earth penetrating
- W8 for SSM-N-8 Regulus (cancelled): earth penetrating
- Mark 11 nuclear bomb (1956–1960): earth penetrating
- Mk 105 Hotpoint (1958–1965): laydown delivery
- B28 nuclear bomb (1958–1991): laydown delivery and ground burst
- Mark 39 nuclear bomb (1958–1962) laydown delivery and ground burst
- B43 nuclear bomb (1961–1990): laydown delivery and ground burst
- B53 nuclear bomb (1962–1997): laydown delivery
- B57 nuclear bomb (1963–1993): laydown delivery
- B61 nuclear bomb (1968–present): laydown delivery and ground burst
  - Mod 11 (1997–present): earth penetrating, laydown delivery, and ground burst
- W61 for MGM-134 Midgetman (cancelled): earth penetrating
- B77 nuclear bomb (cancelled): laydown delivery
- B83 nuclear bomb (1983–present): laydown delivery and ground burst
- W86 for Pershing II (cancelled): earth penetrating
- Robust Nuclear Earth Penetrator (cancelled): earth penetrating
- Nuclear Deterrent System-Air-delivered (NDS-A) (under study or in early development) Possibly designated B94.

== See also ==
- Earthquake bomb
- Underground nuclear weapons testing
- Nuclear strategy
- Thermobaric weapon
- Nuclear weapon
- List of nuclear weapons
