= Nuclear weapon yield =

Energy released in nuclear weapons explosions

Log–log plot comparing the yield (in kilotonnes) and mass (in kilograms) of various nuclear weapons developed by the United States.

The explosive yield of a nuclear weapon is the amount of energy released such as blast, thermal, and nuclear radiation, when that particular nuclear weapon is detonated. It is usually expressed as a TNT equivalent, the standardized equivalent mass of trinitrotoluene (TNT) which would produce the same energy discharge if detonated, either in kilotonnes (symbol kt, thousands of tonnes of TNT) or in megatonnes (Mt, millions of tonnes of TNT). It is also sometimes expressed in terajoules (TJ); an explosive yield of one terajoule is equal to 0.239 kilotonnes of TNT. Because the accuracy of any measurement of the energy released by TNT has always been problematic, the conventional definition is that one kilotonne of TNT is held simply to be equivalent to 10^{12} calories.

The yield-to-weight ratio is the amount of weapon yield compared to the mass of the weapon. The practical maximum yield-to-weight ratio for fusion weapons (thermonuclear weapons) has been estimated to six megatonnes of TNT per tonne of bomb mass (25 TJ/kg). Yields of 5.2 megatonnes/tonne and higher have been reported for large weapons constructed for single-warhead use in the early 1960s. Since then, the smaller warheads needed to achieve the increased net damage efficiency (bomb damage/bomb mass) of multiple warhead systems have resulted in increases in the yield/mass ratio for single modern warheads.

== Examples of nuclear weapon yields ==
In order of increasing yield (most yield figures are approximate):

Bomb	Yield		Notes	Weight of nuclear material
Bomb	kt TNT	TJ	Notes	Weight of nuclear material
Davy Crockett	0.02	0.084	Variable yield tactical nuclear weapon—mass only 23 kg (51 lb), lightest ever deployed by the United States (same warhead as Special Atomic Demolition Munition and GAR-11 Nuclear Falcon missile).	
AIR-2 Genie	1.5	6.3	An unguided air-to-air rocket armed with a W25 nuclear warhead developed to intercept bomber squadrons.	Total weight of nuclear material and bomb was 98.8 - 100.2 kg
Hiroshima's "Little Boy" gravity bomb	13–18	54–75	Gun type uranium-235 fission bomb (the first of the two nuclear weapons that have been used in warfare).	64 kg of Uranium-235, about 1.38% of the uranium fissioned
Nagasaki's "Fat Man" gravity bomb	19–23	79–96	Implosion type plutonium-239 fission bomb (the second of the two nuclear weapons used in warfare).	6.2 kg of Plutonium-239, about 1 kg fissioned
W76 warhead	100	420	Twelve of these may be in a MIRVed Trident II missile; treaty limited to eight.	
W87 warhead	300	1,300	Ten of these were in a MIRVed LGM-118A Peacekeeper.	
W88 warhead	475	1,990	Eight of these may be in a Trident II missile.	
Ivy King device	500	2,100	Most powerful US pure fission bomb, 60 kg uranium, implosion type. Never deployed.	60 kg of Highly enriched uranium (HEU)
Orange Herald Small	800	3,300	Most powerful tested UK boosted fission missile warhead.	117 kg of Uranium-235
B83 nuclear bomb	1,200	5,000	Variable yield weapon, most powerful US weapon in active service.	
B53 nuclear bomb	9,000	38,000	Was the most powerful US bomb in active service until 1997. 50 were retained as part of the "Hedge" portion of the Enduring Stockpile until completely dismantled in 2011. The Mod 11 variant of the B61 replaced the B53 in the bunker busting role. The W53 warhead from the weapon was used on the Titan II Missile until the system was decommissioned in 1987.	
Castle Bravo device	15,000	63,000	Most powerful US test. Never deployed.	400 kg of Lithium-6 deuteride
EC17/Mk-17, the EC24/Mk-24, and the B41 (Mk-41)	25,000	100,000	Most powerful US weapons ever: 25 megatonnes of TNT (100 PJ); the Mk-17 was also the largest by area square footage and mass cubic footage: about 20 short tons (18,000 kg). The Mk-41 or B41 had a mass of 4800 kg and yield of 25 Mt; this equates to being the highest yield-to-weight weapon ever mass-produced. All were gravity bombs carried by the B-36 bomber (retired by 1957).	
The entire Operation Castle nuclear test series	48,200	202,000	The highest-yielding test series conducted by the US.	
Tsar Bomba device	50,000	210,000	USSR, most powerful nuclear weapon ever detonated, yield of 50 megatonnes, (50 million tonnes of TNT). In its "final" form (i.e. with a depleted uranium tamper instead of one made of lead) it would have been 100 megatonnes.	
All nuclear testing as of 1996	510,300	2,135,000	Total energy expended during all nuclear testing.	

Comparative fireball radii for a selection of nuclear weapons. Contrary to the image, which may depict the initial fireball radius, the maximum average fireball radius of Castle Bravo, a 15-megatonne yield surface burst, is 3.3 to 3.7 km (2.1 to 2.3 mi), and not the 1.42 km displayed in the image. Similarly the maximum average fireball radius of a 21-kilotonne low altitude airburst, which is the modern estimate for the Fat Man, is .21 to .24 km (0.13 to 0.15 mi), and not the 0.1 km of the image.

In comparison, the blast yield of the GBU-43 Massive Ordnance Air Blast bomb is 0.011 kt, and that of the Oklahoma City bombing, using a truck-based fertilizer bomb, was 0.002 kt. The estimated strength of the explosion at the Port of Beirut is 0.3-0.5 kt. Most artificial non-nuclear explosions are considerably smaller than even what are considered to be very small nuclear weapons.

=== Yield limits ===
The yield-to-mass ratio is the amount of weapon yield compared to the mass of the weapon. The highest achieved values are somewhat lower, and the value tends to be lower for smaller, lighter weapons, of the sort that are emphasized in today's arsenals, designed for efficient MIRV use or delivery by cruise missile systems.

- The 25 Mt yield option reported for the B41 would give it a yield-to-mass ratio of 5.1 megatonnes of TNT per tonne. While this would require a far greater efficiency than any other current U.S. weapon (at least 40% efficiency in a fusion fuel of lithium deuteride), this was apparently attainable, probably by the use of higher than normal lithium-6 enrichment in the lithium deuteride fusion fuel. This results in the B41 still retaining the record for the highest yield-to-mass weapon ever designed.
- The W56 demonstrated a yield-to-mass ratio of 4.96 kt per kilogram of device mass, and very close to the predicted 5.1 kt/kg achievable in the highest yield-to-mass weapon ever built, the 25-megatonne B41. Unlike the B41, which was never proof-tested at full yield, the W56 demonstrated its efficiency in the XW-56X2 Bluestone shot of Operation Dominic in 1962, thus, from information available in the public domain, the W56 may hold the distinction of demonstrating the highest efficiency in a nuclear weapon to date.
- In 1963 DOE declassified statements that the U.S. had the technological capability of deploying a 35 Mt warhead on the Titan II, or a 50–60 Mt gravity bomb on B-52s. Neither weapon was pursued, but either would require yield-to-mass ratios superior to a 25 Mt Mk-41.
- For current smaller US weapons, yield is 600 to 2200 kilotonnes of TNT per tonne. By comparison, for the very small tactical devices such as the Davy Crockett it was 0.4 to 40 kilotonnes of TNT per tonne. For historical comparison, for Little Boy the yield was only 4 kilotonnes of TNT per tonne, and for the largest Tsar Bomba, the yield was 2 megatonnes of TNT per tonne (deliberately reduced from about twice as much yield for the same weapon, so there is little doubt that this bomb as designed was capable of 4 megatonnes per tonne yield).
- The largest pure-fission bomb ever constructed, Ivy King, had a 500 kilotonne yield, which is probably in the range of the upper limit on such designs. Fusion boosting could likely raise the efficiency of such a weapon significantly, but eventually all fission-based weapons have an upper yield limit due to the difficulties of dealing with large critical masses. (The UK's Orange Herald was a very large boosted fission bomb, with a yield of 800 kilotonnes.) However, there is no known upper yield limit for a fusion bomb.

Large single warheads are seldom a part of today's arsenals, since smaller MIRV warheads, spread out over a pancake-shaped destructive area, are far more destructive for a given total yield, or unit of payload mass. This effect results from the fact that destructive power of a single warhead on land scales approximately only as the cube root of its yield, due to blast "wasted" over a roughly hemispherical blast volume, while the strategic target is distributed over a circular land area with limited height and depth. This effect more than makes up for the lessened yield/mass efficiency encountered if ballistic missile warheads are individually scaled down from the maximal size that could be carried by a single-warhead missile.

=== Yield efficiency ===
The efficiency of an atomic bomb is the ratio of the actual yield to the theoretical maximum yield of the atomic bomb. Not all atomic bombs possess the same yield efficiency as each individual bombs design plays a large role in how efficient it can be. In order to maximize yield efficiency one must make sure to assemble the critical mass correctly, as well as implementing instruments such as tampers or initiators in the design. A tamper is typically made of uranium and it holds the core together using its inertia. It is used to prevent the core from separating too soon to generate maximum fission, so as not to cause a "fizzle". The initiator is a source of neutrons either inside of the core, or on the outside of the bomb, and in this case it shoots neutrons at the core at the moment of detonation. It is essentially kick starting the reaction so the maximum fission reactions can occur to maximize yield.

== Milestone nuclear explosions ==
The following list is of milestone nuclear explosions. In addition to the atomic bombings of Hiroshima and Nagasaki, the first nuclear test of a given weapon type for a country is included, as well as tests that were otherwise notable (such as the largest test ever). All yields (explosive power) are given in their estimated energy equivalents in kilotons of TNT (see TNT equivalent). Putative tests (like Vela incident) have not been included.

Date	Name	Yield (kt)	Country	Significance
July 16, 1945	Trinity	18–20	United States	First fission-device test, first plutonium implosion detonation.
August 6, 1945	Little Boy	12–18	United States	Bombing of Hiroshima, Japan, first detonation of a uranium gun-type device, first use of a nuclear device in combat.
August 9, 1945	Fat Man	18–23	United States	Bombing of Nagasaki, Japan, second detonation of a plutonium implosion device (the first being the Trinity Test), second and last use of a nuclear device in combat.
August 29, 1949	RDS-1	22	Soviet Union	First fission-weapon test by the Soviet Union.
May 8, 1951	George	225	United States	First boosted nuclear weapon test, first weapon test to employ fusion in any measure.
October 3, 1952	Hurricane	25	United Kingdom	First fission weapon test by the United Kingdom.
November 1, 1952	Ivy Mike	10,400	United States	First "staged" thermonuclear weapon, with cryogenic fusion fuel, primarily a test device and not weaponized.
November 16, 1952	Ivy King	500	United States	Largest pure-fission weapon ever tested.
August 12, 1953	RDS-6s	400	Soviet Union	First fusion-weapon test by the Soviet Union (not "staged").
March 1, 1954	Castle Bravo	15,000	United States	First "staged" thermonuclear weapon using dry fusion fuel. A serious nuclear fallout accident occurred. Largest nuclear detonation conducted by United States.
November 22, 1955	RDS-37	1,600	Soviet Union	First "staged" thermonuclear weapon test by the Soviet Union (deployable).
May 31, 1957	Orange Herald	720	United Kingdom	Largest boosted fission weapon ever tested. Intended as a fallback "in megaton range" in case British thermonuclear development failed.
November 8, 1957	Grapple X	1,800	United Kingdom	First (successful) "staged" thermonuclear weapon test by the United Kingdom
February 13, 1960	Gerboise Bleue	70	France	First fission weapon test by France.
October 31, 1961	Tsar Bomba	50,000	Soviet Union	Largest thermonuclear weapon ever tested—scaled down from its initial 100 Mt design by 50%.
October 16, 1964	596	22	China	First fission-weapon test by the People's Republic of China.
June 17, 1967	Test No. 6	3,300	China	First "staged" thermonuclear weapon test by the People's Republic of China.
August 24, 1968	Canopus	2,600	France	First "staged" thermonuclear weapon test by France
May 18, 1974	Smiling Buddha	12	India	First fission nuclear explosive test by India.
May 11, 1998	Pokhran-II	45–50	India	First potential fusion-boosted weapon test by India; first deployable fission weapon test by India.
May 28, 1998	Chagai-I	40	Pakistan	First fission weapon (boosted) test by Pakistan
October 9, 2006	2006 nuclear test	under 1	North Korea	First fission-weapon test by North Korea (plutonium-based).
September 3, 2017	2017 nuclear test	200–300	North Korea	First "staged" thermonuclear weapon test claimed by North Korea.

Note

- "Staged" refers to whether it was a "true" thermonuclear weapon of the so-called Teller–Ulam configuration or simply a form of a boosted fission weapon. For a more complete list of nuclear test series, see List of nuclear tests. Some exact yield estimates, such as that of the Tsar Bomba and the tests by India and Pakistan in 1998, are somewhat contested among specialists.

== Calculating yields and controversy ==
Typical energy fractions for fission detonations near sea level
Blast	50%
Thermal energy	35%
Initial ionizing radiation	5%
Residual fallout radiation	10%

Yields of nuclear explosions can be very hard to calculate, even using numbers as rough as in the kilotonne or megatonne range (much less down to the resolution of individual terajoules). Even under very controlled conditions, precise yields can be hard to determine, and for less controlled conditions the margins of error can be quite large. For fission devices, the most precise yield value is found from radiochemical fallout analysis; that is, measuring the quantity of fission products generated, in much the same way as the chemical yield can be measured after a chemical reaction from its reaction products. The radiochemical analysis method was pioneered by Herbert L. Anderson.

For nuclear explosive devices where the fallout is not attainable or would be misleading, neutron activation analysis is often employed as the second most accurate method, with it having been used to determine the yield of both Little Boy and thermonuclear Ivy Mike's respective yields.

Yields can also be inferred in a number of other remote sensing ways, including scaling law calculations based on blast size, infrasound, fireball brightness (Bhangmeter), seismographic data (CTBTO), and the strength of the shock wave.

=== Enrico Fermi's calculation ===
Enrico Fermi famously made a (very) rough calculation of the yield of the Trinity test by dropping small pieces of paper in the air and measuring how far they were moved by the blast wave of the explosion; that is, he found the blast pressure at his distance from the detonation in pounds per square inch, using the deviation of the papers' fall away from the vertical as a crude blast gauge/barograph, and then with pressure X in psi, at distance Y, in miles figures, he extrapolated backwards to estimate the yield of the Trinity device, which he found was about 10 kilotonnes of blast energy.

Fermi later recalled:

I was stationed at the Base Camp at Trinity in a position about ten miles [16 km] from the site of the explosion... About 40 seconds after the explosion the air blast reached me. I tried to estimate its strength by dropping from about six feet small pieces of paper before, during, and after the passage of the blast wave. Since, at the time, there was no wind[,] I could observe very distinctly and actually measure the displacement of the pieces of paper that were in the process of falling while the blast was passing. The shift was about 2 1/2 meters, which, at the time, I estimated to correspond to the blast that would be produced by ten thousand tonnes of TNT.

The surface area (A) and volume (V) of a sphere are $A = 4\pi r^2$ and $V = \frac{4}{3} \pi r^3$ respectively.

The blast wave, however, was likely assumed to grow out as the surface area of the approximately hemispheric near surface burst blast wave of the Trinity gadget. The paper is moved 2.5 meters by the wave, so the effect of the Trinity device is to displace a hemispherical shell of air of volume 2.5 m × 2π(16 km)^{2}. Multiply by 1 atm to get an energy of 4.1×10^{14} J ~ 100 kT TNT.

=== G. I. Taylor's calculation ===
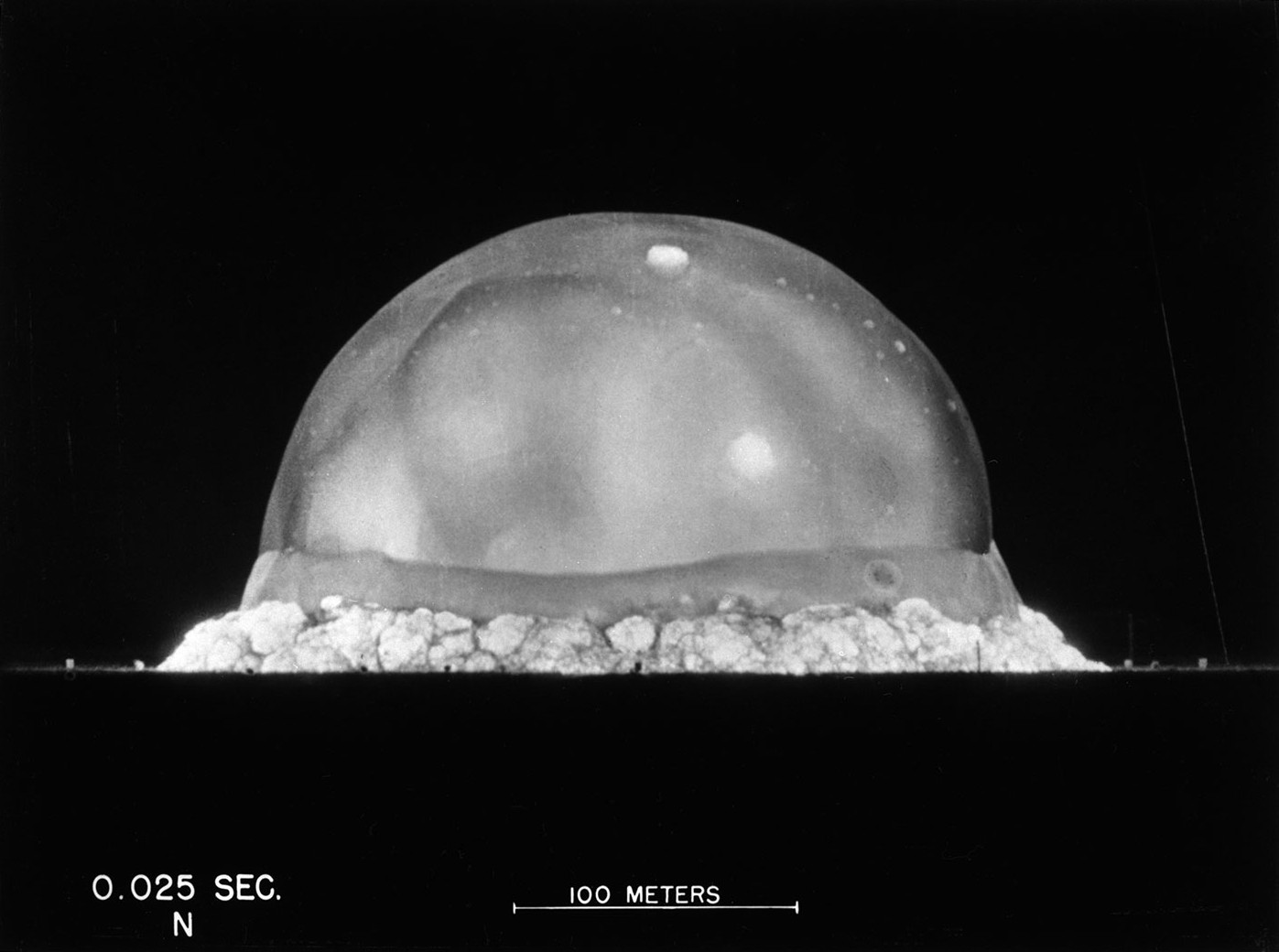
This photograph of the Trinity blast, captured by Berlyn Brixner, was used by G. I. Taylor to estimate its yield.

A good approximation of the yield of the Trinity test device was obtained in 1950 by the British physicist G. I. Taylor from simple dimensional analysis and an estimation of the heat capacity of very hot air. Taylor had initially done this highly classified work in mid-1941 and published an article with an analysis of the Trinity data fireball when the Trinity photograph data was declassified in 1950 (after the USSR had exploded its own version of this bomb).

Taylor noted that the radius R of the blast should initially depend only on the energy E of the explosion, the time t after the detonation, and the density ρ of the air. The only equation having compatible dimensions that can be constructed from these quantities is

$$R = S\left(\frac{E t^2}{\rho}\right)^{\frac{1}{5}}.$$

Here S is a dimensionless constant having a value approximately equal to 1, since it is low-order function of the heat capacity ratio or adiabatic index

$$\gamma = \frac{C_P}{C_V},$$

which is approximately 1 for all conditions.

Using the picture of the Trinity test shown here (which had been publicly released by the U.S. government and published in Life magazine), using successive frames of the explosion, Taylor found that R^{5}/t^{2} is a constant in a given nuclear blast (especially between 0.38 ms, after the shock wave has formed, and 1.93 ms, before significant energy is lost by thermal radiation). Furthermore, he estimated a value for S numerically at 1.

Thus, with t = 0.025 s and the blast radius being 140 metres, and taking ρ to be 1 kg/m^{3} (the measured value at Trinity on the day of the test, as opposed to sea-level values of approximately 1.3 kg/m^{3}) and solving for E, Taylor obtained that the yield was about 22 kilotonnes of TNT (90 TJ). This does not take into account the fact that the energy should only be about half this value for a hemispherical blast, but this very simple argument did agree to within 10% with the official value of the bomb's yield in 1950, which was 20 kilotons of TNT (84 TJ) (see G. I. Taylor, Proc. Roy. Soc. London A 200, pp. 235–247 (1950)).

A good approximation to Taylor's constant S for $\gamma$ below about 2 is

$$S = \left(\frac{75(\gamma - 1)}{8\pi}\right)^{\frac{1}{5}}.$$

The value of the heat capacity ratio here is between the 1.67 of fully dissociated air molecules and the lower value for very hot diatomic air (1.2), and under conditions of an atomic fireball is (coincidentally) close to the STP (standard) gamma for room-temperature air, which is 1.4. This gives the value of Taylor's S constant to be 1.036 for the adiabatic hypershock region where the constant R^{5}/t^{2} condition holds.

As it relates to fundamental dimensional analysis, if one expresses all the variables in terms of mass M, length L, and time T:

$$E = [M \cdot L^2 \cdot T^{-2}]$$

(think of the expression for kinetic energy, $E = mv^2/2$),

$$\rho = [M \cdot L^{-3}],$$

$$t = [T],$$

$$r = [L],$$

and then derive an expression for, say, E, in terms of the other variables, by finding values of $\alpha$, $\beta$, and $\gamma$ in the general relation

$$E = \rho^\alpha \cdot t^\beta \cdot r^\gamma$$

such that the left and right sides are dimensionally balanced in terms of M, L, and T (i.e., each dimension has the same exponent on both sides).

=== Other methods and controversy ===
Where these data are not available, as in a number of cases, precise yields have been in dispute, especially when they are tied to questions of politics. The weapons used in the atomic bombings of Hiroshima and Nagasaki, for example, were highly individual and very idiosyncratic designs, and gauging their yield retrospectively has been quite difficult. The Hiroshima bomb, "Little Boy", is estimated to have been between 12 and 18 kilotonnes of TNT (50 and 75 TJ) (a 20% margin of error), while the Nagasaki bomb, "Fat Man", is estimated to be between 18 and 23 kilotonnes of TNT (75 and 96 TJ) (a 10% margin of error).

Such apparently small changes in values can be important when trying to use the data from these bombings as reflective of how other bombs would behave in combat, and also result in differing assessments of how many "Hiroshima bombs" other weapons are equivalent to (for example, the Ivy Mike hydrogen bomb was equivalent to either 867 or 578 Hiroshima weapons — a rhetorically quite substantial difference — depending on whether one uses the high or low figure for the calculation).

Other disputed yields have included the massive Tsar Bomba, whose yield was claimed between being "only" 50 megatonnes of TNT (210 PJ) or at a maximum of 57 megatonnes of TNT (240 PJ) by differing political figures, either as a way for hyping the power of the bomb or as an attempt to undercut it.

== See also ==
- Effects of nuclear explosions — goes into detail about different effects at different yields
- List of nuclear weapons
