= Mark 41 =

Mark 41 or Mk 41 may refer to

- Mark 41 vertical launching system, a ship-based missile launcher
- Mk 41 or B41 nuclear bomb, the highest-yield nuclear bomb designed by the United States military
