= W56 =

American thermonuclear warhead designed in the late 1950s/early 1960s

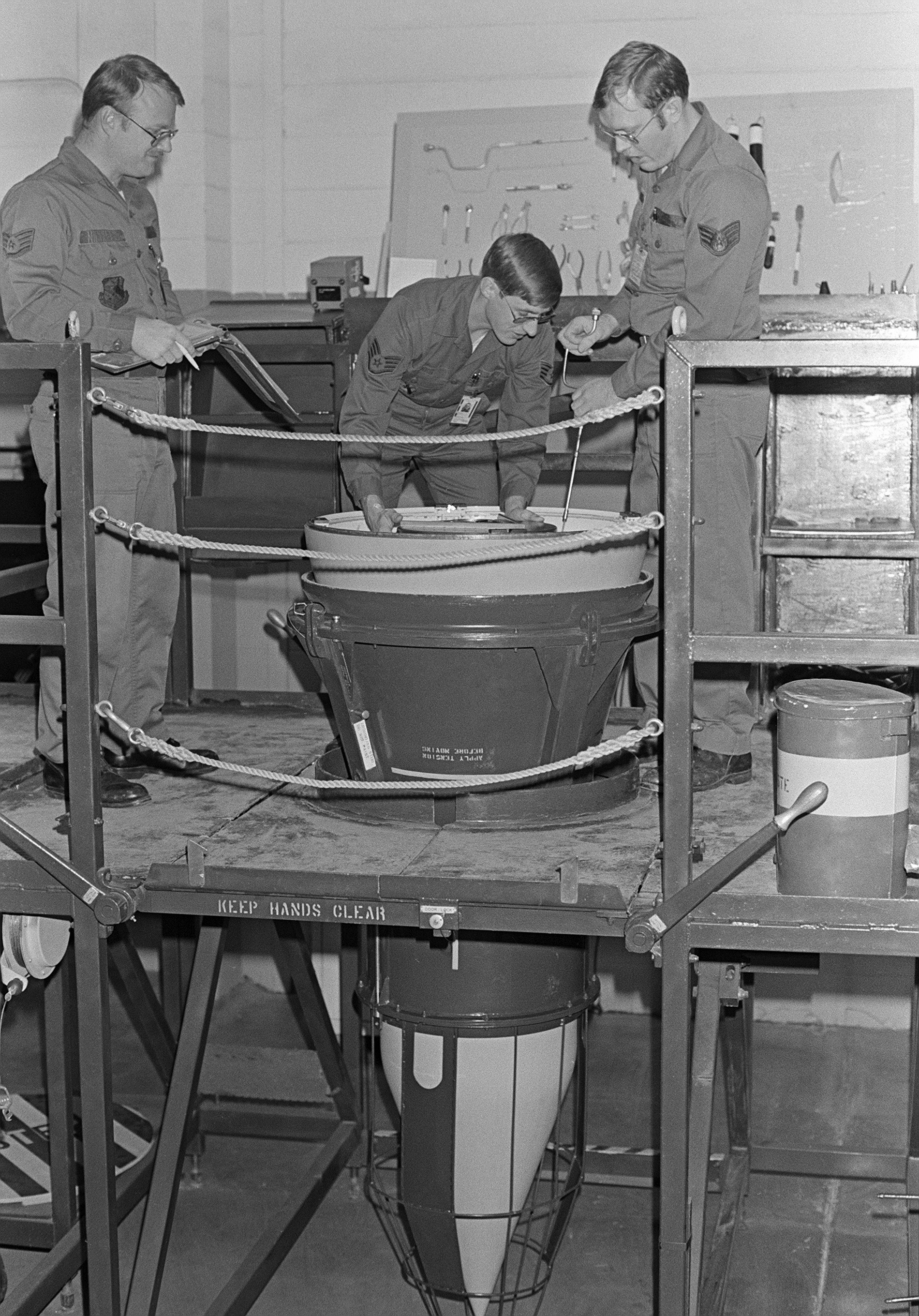
- Technicians work on the W56 Mk-11 warhead of an LGM-30F Minuteman II intercontinental ballistic missile.
- Type: Nuclear warhead

Service history
- In service: 1963-1993
- Used by: United States

Production history
- Designer: Lawrence Livermore National Laboratory
- Designed: 1959 to 1963
- Produced: March 1963 to May 1969.
- No. built: 1000

Specifications
- Mass: 600 pounds (270 kg) sans RV
- Length: 47.3 inches (1,200 mm) sans RV
- Diameter: 17.4 inches (440 mm) sans RV
- Detonation mechanism: Contact, airburst
- Blast yield: 1,200 kilotonnes of TNT (5,000 TJ)

The W56 (originally called the Mark 56) was an American thermonuclear warhead produced starting in 1963 which saw service until 1993, on the Minuteman I and II ICBMs.

The warhead had a yield of 1.2 megatonnes of TNT (5.0 PJ) and a demonstrated yield-to-weight ratio of 4.96 kilotonnes of TNT per kilogram (20.8 petajoules per tonne), very close to the predicted 5.1 kilotonne of TNT/kg (21 PJ/t) achievable in the highest yield to weight weapon ever built, the 25 megatonnes of TNT (100 PJ) B41. Unlike the B41, which was never tested at its full yield, the W56 demonstrated its efficiency in the XW-56-X2 Bluestone shot of Operation Dominic in 1962.

Production of the Mod 1 warhead began in March 1963. The Mod 4 warhead began production in May 1967 and finished production in May 1969. 1,000 total were produced, of which 455 were Mod 4 warheads. The warheads were retired between 1991 and 1993, and the last W56 warhead was dismantled in June 2006. During dismantlement, one warhead which had high-performance but sensitive polymer-bonded explosive in its explosive lenses is reported to have nearly detonated in 2005 when an unsafe amount of pressure was applied to the explosive while it was being disassembled.

== History ==
The W56 program began with the need for two new warheads to arm Weapons System WS-133A, later known as Minuteman. The study, released in March 1958, suggested that two warhead designs be produced; a 330-pound (150 kg) warhead and a 550-pound (250 kg) warhead. These warheads were to have the maximum achievable yield within the specified weight and have an operational deployment date of mid-1962.

A feasibility study group met 5 May 1958 and having been asked to complete the study quickly, concluded after one day that the lightweight warhead requirement could be met through a modification of the W50 used in MGM-31 Pershing while the heavy warhead could be developed through a rework of the Navy's W47 warhead for Polaris A-1. Little action was taken on these findings during 1958 however, due to a lack of Minuteman funding.

A second feasibility study was published in March 1959 which reported that the weight of the W47 could be reduced and that as the US had suspended nuclear testing, focus on a design that did not require testing was required. Later that month, the Air Force Special Weapons Center accelerated the Minuteman program and requested a new availability date from Sandia who replied that the main restraint on availability was the need for six warhead flight tests approximately one year before production could begin. If the W47 was used without change, the tests could be completed by December 1959 but if the warhead was modified tests could extend by as much as a year.

In August the Joint Chiefs of Staff assigned the requirements for the warhead. They established a maximum warhead diameter of 20 inches (510 mm), a length of 60 inches (1,500 mm) and a weight of 600 pounds (270 kg), with the highest possible yield obtainable in this weight and package size. AVCO Manufacturing were assigned development of the reentry vehicle.

In September, the military characteristics were specified and required ground and air burst fuzing, that the warhead require minimal servicing and that it be able to be left unattended for up to 3 years at a time. The warhead was to contain no primary power source unless the use of a ferromagnetic X-unit was required, and it would contain an environmental safing device located in the warhead in a manner as to minimize the possibility of a sabotage nuclear detonation.

Development of the warhead was initially assigned to Lawrence Radiation Laboratory and in November 1959 the development names XW-56 and XW-56-X1 were assigned to the program. Though derived from the W47, Sandia believed that as the non-nuclear components of the weapon would be lighter than those in the W47, with the gross warhead weight of the XW-56 being about 670 pounds (300 kg). As no new materials were required by the program and all components were used in other projects, early production was scheduled from mid-1962.

Concurrently, the XW-56-X1 was developed. The warhead was to be an improved XW-56, but by August 1960, the Radiation Laboratory believed in treating the XW-56-X1 as an entirely new weapon, taking advantage of all possible design improvements. The intention at this point was for the XW-56-X1 to arm Minuteman, but if missiles were to become operational before the planned stockpile entry date of July 1963, the XW-56 would be used instead.

By August 1960 however, it became clear that Minuteman's production scheduled has slipped, and that producing the XW-56 as an interim warhead was less necessary, leading to questions as to if development of both weapons slowed the development of the XW-56-X1. The Radiation Laboratory believed that there was some benefit to having the less advanced but tested XW-56 alongside the more advanced but untested XW-56-X1, but field command believed there was no advantage to a mixture of tested and untested warheads, and instead requested that only the XW-56-X1 be produced. In December the Division of Military Applications cancelled the XW-56 warhead program.

In September 1960, XW-56-X1 apparently received a new primary stage design, developed by Los Alamos National Laboratory. The proposed ordnance characteristics of the weapon states that the warhead would be connected to the reentry vehicle though a single flange that provided cantilevered support of the warhead. This helped relieve thermal expansion issues between the warhead and reentry vehicle. The warhead also included a system to prevent transfer of boosting gas to the pit in the event of a fire. The warhead received approval as the Minuteman warhead on 13 October 1960.

The XW-56-X1 warhead, now called the Mark 56 Mod 1 had a planned availability date of April 1963. A series of flight tests of the warhead were conducted from July 1962 and the planned production date was May 1963. In June 1961 a new production date of February 1963 was requested alongside increased early production rates, but after discussing the difficulties in meeting this goal, the request was dropped.

However, in January 1962, a new requirement for the use of external initiation and a chopper-converter firing set was added. This produced the XW-56-X2 warhead. It was decided that the XW-56-X1 would no longer be designated the Mark 56 Mod 1, but that the XW-56-X2 would instead take the Mod 1 nomenclature. The warhead was design released in May 1962 and production began in March 1963. The warhead was 17.4 inches (440 mm) in diameter, 47.3 inches (1,200 mm) long and weighed 600 pounds (270 kg), and fitted to the Mark 11 reentry vehicle.

In December 1962, it was noted that efforts were being made to harden the warhead against blast effects such as those from anti-ballistic missile systems. The decision was made to change the way the warhead was mounted to the reentry vehicle. Instead of a single flange, a honeycomb sleeve would be placed between the warhead and reentry vehicle, and would provide area loading. This interim design, the XW-56-X3 was given the production nomenclature Mark 56 Mod 2. The design was not interchangeable with the Mod 1 warhead and production was planned for April 1964.

The Mod 2 design was, with minor exceptions, identical to the Mod 1 design. Changes included new inertial switches as the originals could not survive the shocks involved, and a new neutron generator redesigned to improve the mounting system for the generator. The new reentry vehicle was called the Mark 11A. With the warhead in its reentry vehicle the total system was 32 inches (810 mm) in diameter, 80.5 inches (2,040 mm) long and weighed 831 pounds (377 kg). Production was achieved in August 1964.

In May 1966, Sandia National Laboratories and Livermore began work on a hard (high energy) x-ray hardening program for the W56. The exact changes made are still classified, but one portion was the inclusion of a forward shield. The modified warhead was designated the XW-56-X4 and given the production nomenclature of Mark 56 Mod 3. Existing Mod 2 warheads were retrofitted to the Mod 3 design. Early production was achieved in February 1967.

A final weapon, the Mark 56 Mod 4 began development in March 1967. The program was to further harden the weapon against the effects of x-rays. Production began in May 1967. No further details of the Mod 4 warhead have been declassified other than that it may have weighed 680 pounds (310 kg).

== Mods and engineering names ==
The weapon had separate engineering and production (mod numbered) names.

Engineering name	Production name	Production dates	Notes
XW-56	None	Never entered production	Initial warhead development. Used tested components from W47 warhead. May have been named Mark 56 Mod 0.
XW-56-X1	Mark 56 Mod 1	Never entered production	Initial warhead for Mark 56 Mod 1, replaced in favor of XW-56-X2. Lawrence Livermore described it as "an entirely new weapon taking advantage of all possible design improvements". May have used a Los Alamos developed primary stage. Internally initiated.
XW-56-X2	Mark 56 Mod 1	March 1963 to ?	Initial production warhead. Was the same as the XW-56-X1 except that it used external initiatiors and a chopper-converter firing set. Not compatible with Mod 2 upgrade.
XW-56-X3	Mark 56 Mod 2	August 1964 to ?	Increased resistance of the warhead to blast effects produced by anti missile defence systems
XW-56-X4	Mark 56 Mod 3	February 1967 to ?	High-energy x-ray resistant warhead.
Not known.	Mark 56 Mod 4	May 1967 to May 1969	X-ray resistant warhead. No engineering name for the W56 Mod 4 is given, but may have been XW-56-X5

== See also ==
- List of nuclear weapons
- United States and weapons of mass destruction
