= B41 nuclear bomb =

American high-yield thermonuclear weapon

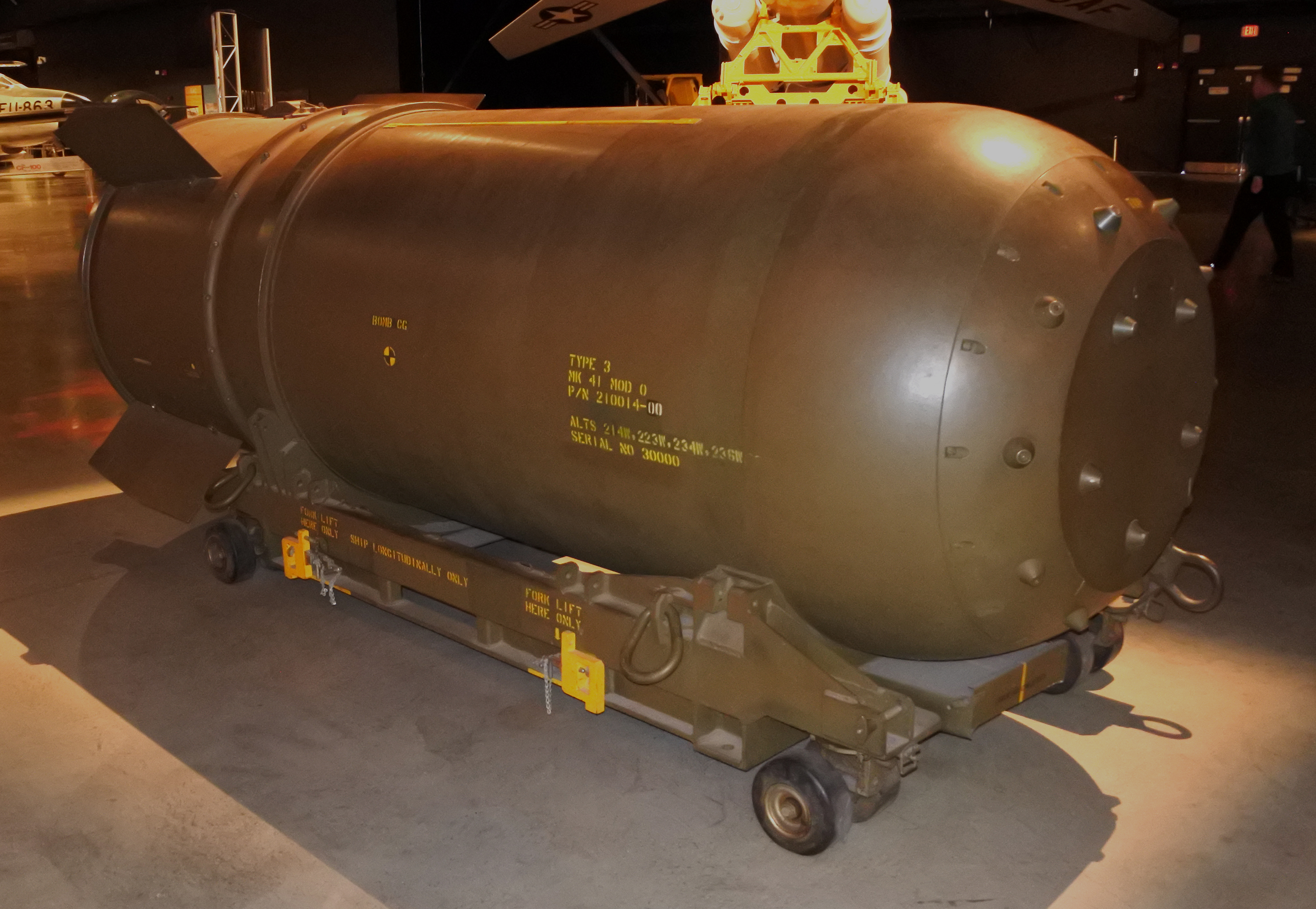
Mark 41 thermonuclear bomb casing at the National Museum of the United States Air Force.

The B-41 (also known as Mk-41) was a thermonuclear weapon deployed by the United States Strategic Air Command in the early 1960s. It was the most powerful nuclear bomb ever developed by the United States, with a maximum yield of 25 megatons of TNT (100 petajoules). A top secret document (DCI Briefing to the JCS, 30 July 1963), states "The US has stockpiled bombs of 9 MT and 23 MT..." which would likely be referring to the B-41's actual yield of 23 MT (the 9 MT reference would be the B53. The B-41 was the only three-stage thermonuclear weapon fielded by the U.S.

== History ==
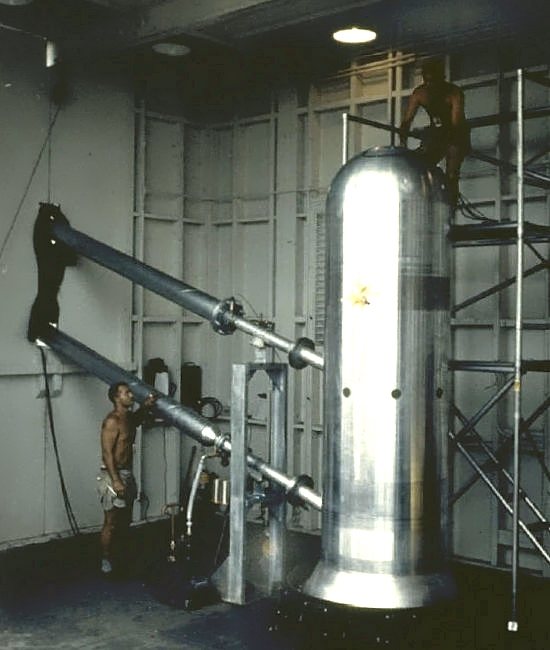
TX-41 'Bassoon Prime' test device within shot-cab during Operation Redwing; the progenitor of the air-deliverable B-41

In June 1955, the US Department of Defense requested a feasibility study for a Class B (over 10,000 lb or 4,500 kg weight) bomb and warhead. By mid-1956, US Air Force Strategic Air Command produced a requirement for a 62-inch (1,600 mm) Class B bomb, while the DoD produced a requirement for a 60-inch (1,500 mm) Class B warhead.

The University of California's Radiation Laboratory (now known as the Lawrence Livermore National Laboratory) proposed the use of the existing Bassoon device that was test fired in the Zuni and Tewa shots of Operation Redwing. Stockpiling of this new weapon was planned for January 1959. Dirty and clean (low fission fraction) versions of the device were proposed, with the clean version being dependent on a nuclear test in Operation Hardtack I.

The nomenclature of TX-41 and XW-41 (Note: The prefix TX was used for developmental bombs while the XW prefix was used for developmental warheads.) was assigned to the weapon in November 1956, and in December plans were made to conduct drop tests of the weapon from the B-47 bomber. A laydown version of the bomb was requested, however development of such a weapon would add 1 to 2 more years to its development. A non-laydown weapon was subsequently requested. The weapon's military characteristics were approved in February 1957.

The weapon was to be carried by the B-47, B-52, B-66 and systems 110A and 125A. The bomb would be able to withstand the various flight stresses without damage. Fuzing would include contact and air-burst modes, and would be selectable in flight. Contact fuzing would act as a backup for airburst fuzing and a parachute to slow the rate of fall would be developed. Compatibility with the Navaho missile and B-58 bomb pod was also requested.

B-41 loading, and deployment via B-52 Stratofortress bomber over Johnston Island, Operation Dominic.

By March 1957, it was decided to place equal emphasis on the clean and dirty versions of the weapon. By this point the weapon was to be 50 inches (1,300 mm) in diameter, with a warhead length of 120 inches (3,000 mm) and weight of 9,300 pounds (4,200 kg), while the bomb was to have a length of 145 inches (3,700 mm) and weigh 10,000 pounds (4,500 kg). Compatibility with the B-58 was canceled in May 1957, and the warhead version of the weapon was canceled in July 1957.

In July 1957, tests of the contact fuze were made by firing 75-millimetre (3.0 in) shells through the nose of the bomb. These tests showed that there was sufficient time between contact and the firing signal being sent for the fuze design to work correctly. In August 1957, the primary of the device in a device mockup was tested during shot Smoky of Operation Plumbbob, yielding 44 kilotonnes of TNT (180 TJ). The device was subsequently tested in shots Sycamore, Poplar and Pine of Hardtack I in 1958. Sycamore, a clean test, was a fizzle, producing only 92 kilotonnes of TNT (380 TJ) instead of the predicted 5 megatonnes of TNT (21 PJ). Poplar was a retest of Sycamore with a predicted yield of 5 to 10 megatonnes of TNT (21 to 42 PJ) and only 200 kilotonnes of TNT (840 TJ) fission yield. The actual yield was 9.3 megatonnes of TNT (39 PJ). Pine was a three-stage variant of the clean device, with a predicted yield of 4 to 6 megatonnes of TNT (17 to 25 PJ), but the test only yielded 2 megatonnes of TNT (8.4 PJ).

Redwing-Tewa shot during Operation Redwing, yielding 5 megatons

In June 1958, the requirement to be able to select air and ground burst fuzing modes from the cockpit was canceled. This change meant that fuzing selection had to be made on the ground before takeoff. In August 1958, the production date for the weapon slipped to May 1960. Issues with the weapon meant that compatibility was limited to the B-47 and B-52 bombers. Compatibility with the B-70 would require significant changes to the aircraft. Further, due to the new emphasis on low level releases to avoid radar detection and due to the fact that the TX-41 could only be dropped from high altitude, the question of continuing the program was raised.

One item in favor of continuing the program was that the 10,000-pound (4,500 kg) bomb could replace the 17,500-pound (7,900 kg) Mark 36 bomb. Another proposal was to delay the program and include a full-fuzing (FUFO) capability into the weapon that would allow for laydown delivery. However, in September 1958, the Radiation Laboratory and Sandia informed Field Command that to add FUFO to the weapon would require a completely new weapon, including nuclear testing.

In November 1958 it was decided that the weapon would always be deployed in the parachute retarded condition, and thus an option selector switch was no longer needed. In December, Sandia raised issues with the safety of the weapon and proposed additional safing devices. This was provided with additional switches in the aircraft monitor station. In January 1959, the previous decision to only use parachute retarded fuzing was reversed and it was asked to reinstate the fuzing selector.

Pilot production of the weapon was authorized in April 1959 and full production authorized in September 1959. Early production of the Mark 41 Mod 0 was achieved in September 1960 and production continued until June 1962. Approximately 500 bombs were produced. The weapon was replaced by the more versatile B53 bomb between November 1963 and July 1976.

== Design ==
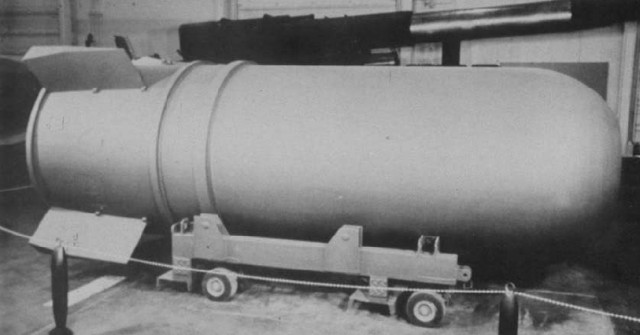
The casing of a B-41 thermonuclear bomb.

The weapon was 12 ft 4 in (3.76 m) long, with a body diameter of 4 ft 4 in (1.32 m). It weighed 10,670 lb (4,840 kg). It was carried only by the B-52 Stratofortress and B-47 Stratojet. It could be deployed in free-fall or retarded free-fall, and had both air burst and ground burst fuzing. The weapon did not have a laydown fuzing capability as the design of the physics package did not make that possible without extensive redesign and further nuclear testing.

The B-41 was the only three-stage thermonuclear weapon fielded by the US. Two versions were deployed: The Mk-41Y1, a 25 megatonnes of TNT (100 PJ) yield, dirty version with a tertiary stage encased with U-238 (natural uranium); and the Mk-41Y2, a 10 megatonnes of TNT (42 PJ) yield, clean version with a lead-encased tertiary. It was the highest-yield nuclear weapon ever fielded by the United States, and had the highest publicly known yield-to-weight ratio of any weapon.

== Efficiency ==
During its operational lifetime, the B-41 was the most efficient known thermonuclear weapon in terms of yield to actual weight, with a 5.2 megatons of TNT per tonne (22 petajoules per tonne) ratio (based on a 25 Mt (100 PJ) yield). Its blast yield was 25% to 50% that of the AN602 Tsar Bomba, which delivered a blast of 50 or 100 Mt (210 or 420 PJ), depending on its own configuration as a clean or dirty bomb. However even at the Tsar Bomb's theoretical maximum yield of 100 Mt (420 PJ), it would still only achieve a yield to weight ratio of ~ 3.7 megatons of TNT per tonne (15 petajoules per tonne), thus the B-41 has one of the highest yield to weight ratio of any weapon ever created (the highest recorded was the Ripple design in shot Housatonic of Operation Dominic).

== W41 warhead ==
In November 1956, development of the W41, a warhead version of the B41, began at Lawrence Livermore National Laboratory. Investigated as a possible warhead for the SM-64 Navaho, a cruise missile then in development, work on the warhead continued through July 1957, when the project was canceled.

== Gallery ==
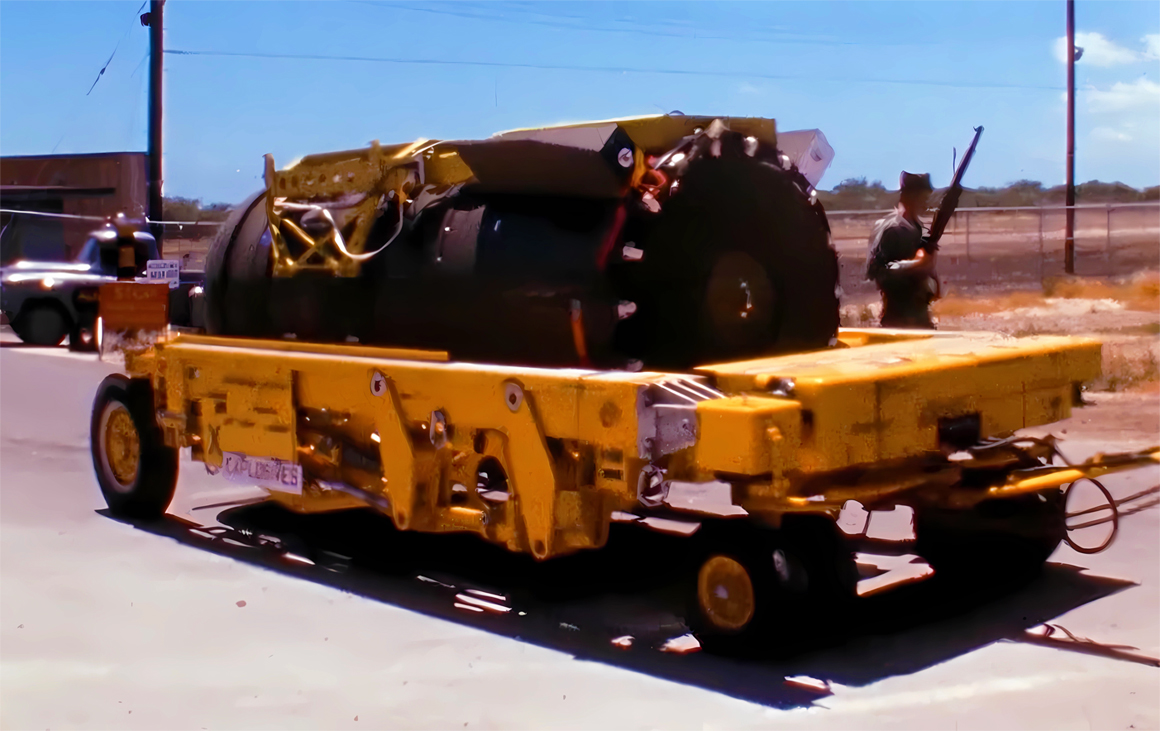

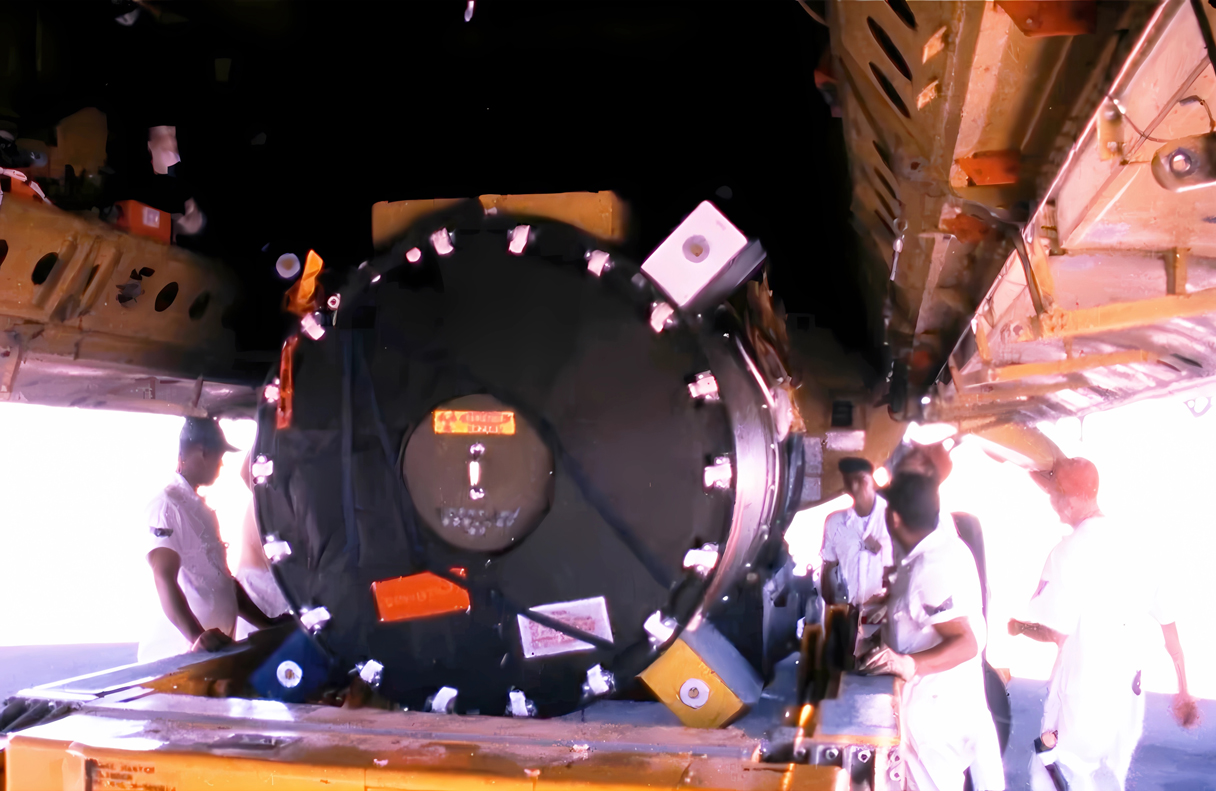

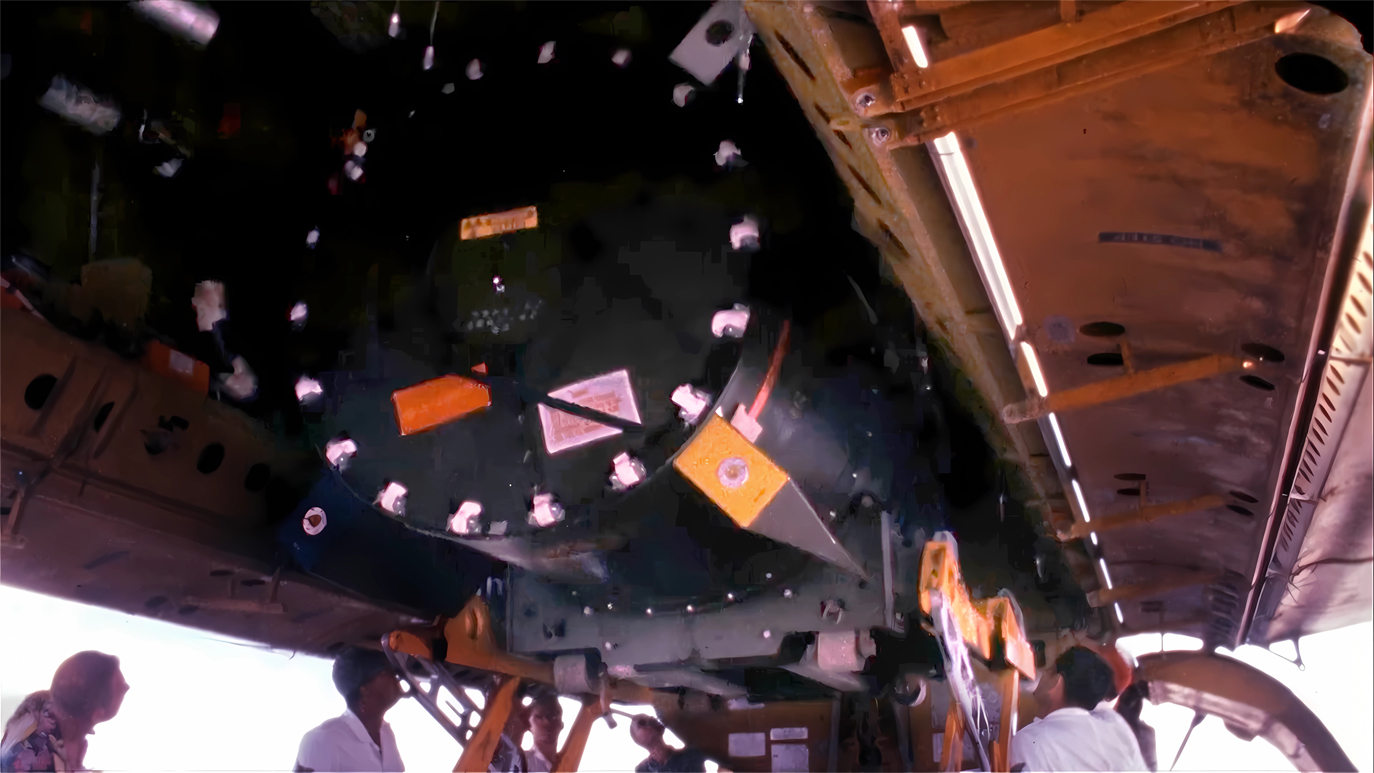

== See also ==
- List of nuclear weapons
- Nuclear weapon yield
