= B83 nuclear bomb =

American thermonuclear gravity bomb

B83
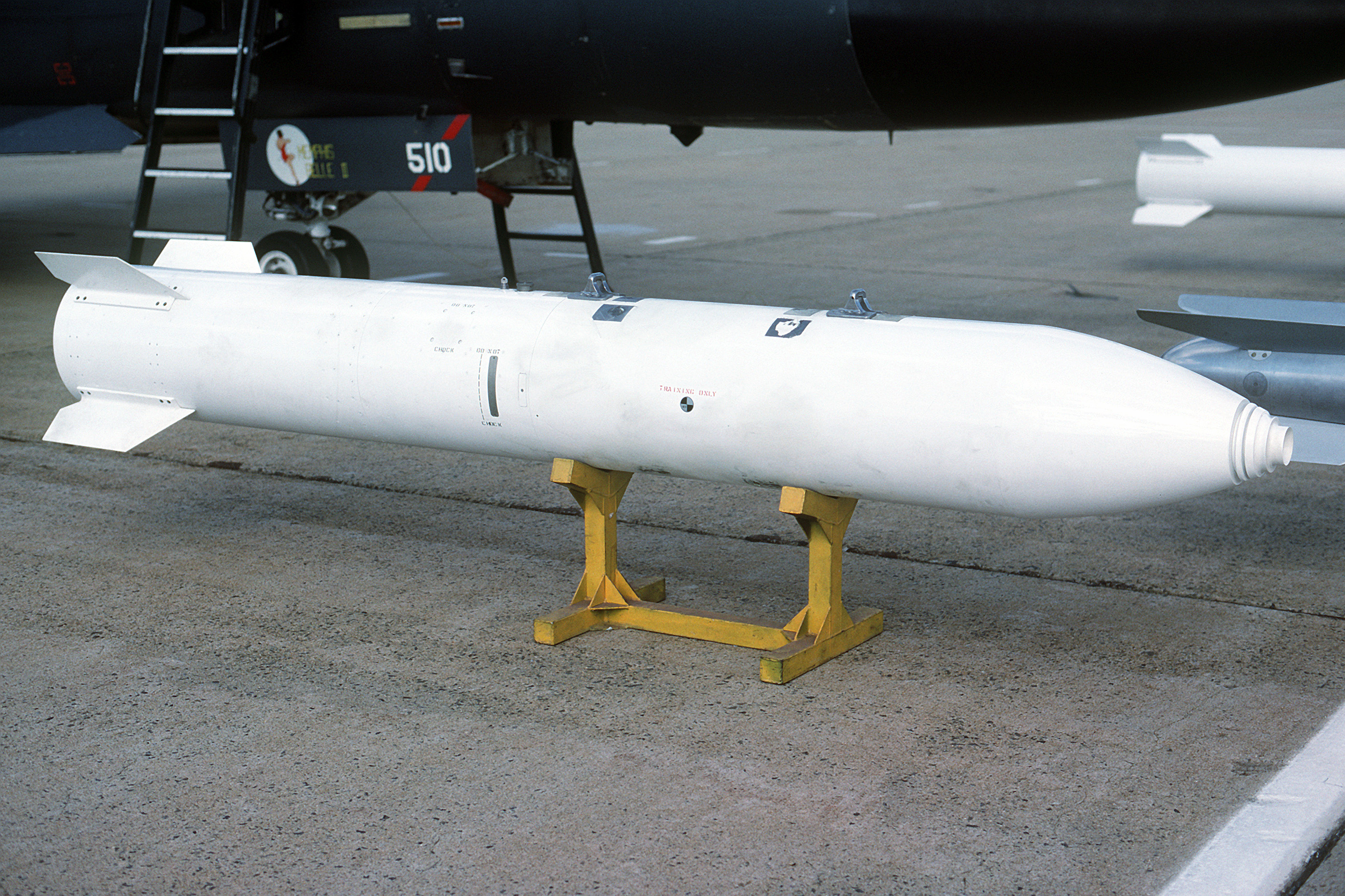
- A B-83 nuclear bomb trainer beside an FB-111 aircraft
- Type: Unguided bomb

Service history
- In service: 1983–present
- Used by: United States

Production history
- Designer: Lawrence Livermore National Laboratory
- No. built: 650

Specifications
- Mass: 2,465 pounds (1,118 kg)
- Length: 12 feet (3.7 m)
- Diameter: 18 inches (46 cm)
- Blast yield: 1,200 kt (5,000 TJ)

The B83 nuclear bomb is an unguided variable-yield thermonuclear weapon developed by the United States during the late 1970s. Designed by Lawrence Livermore National Laboratory, the bomb first entered service in 1983. With a yield of up to 1.2 megatons TNT equivalent, it has been the most powerful nuclear weapon in the United States arsenal since 2011, when the B53 nuclear bomb was retired.

About 650 B83s were built. The bomb remains in service as part of the United States "Enduring Stockpile".

== History ==
The B83 was based partly on the earlier B77 program, which was terminated because of cost overruns. The B77 was designed with an active altitude control and lifting parachute system for supersonic low-altitude delivery from the B-1A bomber. Independent researcher Chuck Hansen suggested that the B77 nuclear component test firings were performed during the Operation Anvil series, specifically the "Cheese" test shots in 1975 and 1976:

- Anvil Kasseri – 28 October 1975, 1,200 kilotons (B77/B83 full yield)
- Anvil Muenster – 3 January 1976, 800 kilotons
- Anvil Fontina – 12 February 1976, 900 kilotons
- Anvil Colby – 14 March 1976, 800 kilotons

The B83 replaced several earlier weapons, including the B28, B43, and, to some extent, the ultra-high-yield B53. It was the first U.S. nuclear weapon designed from the start to avoid accidental detonation, with the use of "insensitive explosives" in the trigger lens system.

With the dismantling of the last B53 bomb in 2011, the B83 became the highest-yield nuclear weapon in the U.S. arsenal. In 2022, the Biden administration announced plans to retire the B83. Once the B83 is retired, the W88 nuclear warhead, deployed on the Trident D5LE missile, will become the most powerful nuclear weapon of the United States, with a yield of 455 kilotons. The B61-13 is planned to replace the B83. Although its yield is lower at 360 kilotons, it incorporates guidance features of the B61-12 for better accuracy while being more powerful than that version to strike harder and large-area targets.

== Design ==
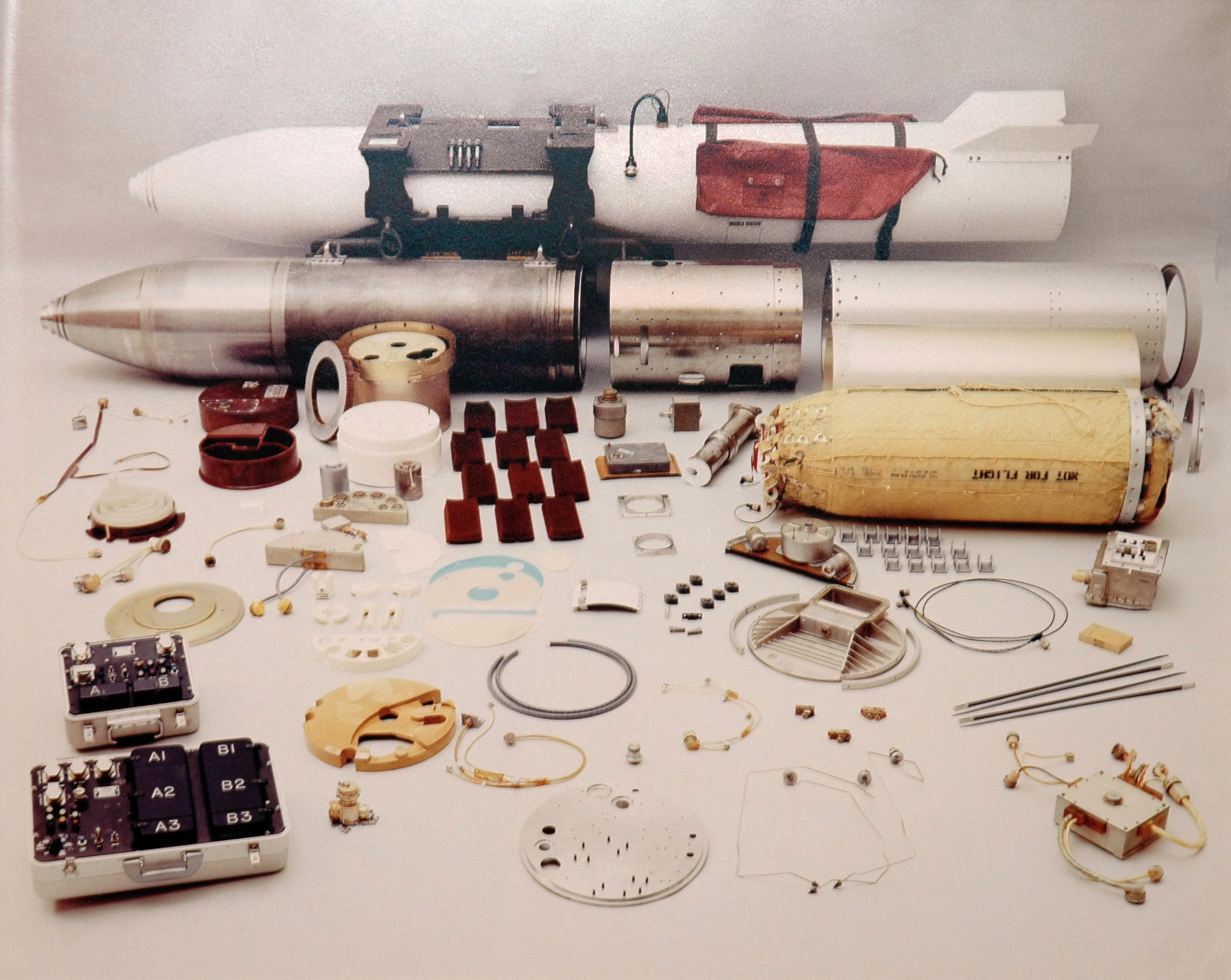
B83 with unclassified components at front

The bomb is 12 feet (3.7 m) long, with a diameter of 18 inches (460 mm), and weighs approximately 2,400 pounds (1,100 kg). The location of the lifting lugs shows that the greater part of the total mass is contained in the nuclear explosive. Its layout is similar to that of the smaller B61, with the warhead mounted in the forward part of the weapon to make the bomb nose-heavy. It was intended for high-speed carriage (up to Mach 2.0) and delivery at high or low altitude. For the latter role, it is equipped with a parachute retardation system, with a 46-foot (14 m) Kevlar ribbon parachute capable of rapid deceleration. It can be employed in free-fall, retarded, contact, and laydown modes, for air-burst or ground-burst detonation. Security features include next-generation permissive action link (PAL) and a command disablement system (CDS), rendering the weapon tactically useless without a nuclear yield.

The bomb has a variable yield: the destructive power is adjustable from somewhere in the low kiloton range up to a maximum of 1.2 megatons, some 80 times the explosive power of the bomb dropped on Hiroshima. The weapon is protected by a Category "D" Permissive Action Link (PAL) that prevents the enabling or detonation of the weapon without proper authorization.

== Aircraft capable of carrying the B83 ==
The following aircraft are certified for carrying the B83 bomb:

- B-52 Stratofortress (formerly)
- B-1B Lancer (formerly)
- B-2 Spirit
- B-21 Raider (future)

Nuclear capability has been removed from the B-1B, mostly attributed to START I & START II, and the B-52 no longer carries gravity nuclear bombs.

== Novel uses ==
The B83 is one of the weapons considered for use in the "Nuclear Bunker Buster" project, which for a time was known as the Robust Nuclear Earth Penetrator, or RNEP. While most efforts have focused on the smaller B61-11 nuclear bomb, Los Alamos National Laboratory was also analyzing the use of the B83 in this role.

The physics package contained within the B83 has been studied for use in asteroid impact avoidance strategies against any seriously threatening near earth asteroids. Six such warheads, configured for the maximum yield of 1.2 megatons, would be deployed by maneuvering space vehicles to "knock" an asteroid off course, should it pose a risk to the Earth.

== See also ==
- B61 nuclear bomb
- List of nuclear weapons
