= Variable yield =

Option available on many nuclear weapons

Variable yield, or dial-a-yield, is an option available on most modern nuclear weapons. It allows the operator to specify a weapon's yield, or explosive power, allowing a single design to be used in different situations. For example, the Mod-10 B61 bomb had selectable explosive yields of 0.3, 5, 10 or 80 kilotons, depending on how the ground crew set a dial inside the casing when it was loaded onto an aircraft.

== Technology ==
Variable yield technology has existed since at least the late 1950s. Examples of variable yield weapons include the B61 nuclear bomb family, B83, B43, W80, W85, and WE177A warheads.

Most modern nuclear weapons are Teller–Ulam design type thermonuclear weapons, with a fission primary stage and a fusion secondary stage that is collapsed by the energy from the primary. These offer at least three methods to vary yield:

- Varying primary yield by boosting with fusion, using small amounts of deuterium / tritium (DT) gas inside the primary fission bomb to increase its yield by supplying additional neutrons from DT fusion at the beginning of the fission process. Typically, the gas is injected a few seconds before detonation and the amount used can be preset – e.g., zero, 25%, 50%, or all of the gas.
- Changing the primary yield by varying the timing or use of external neutron initiators (ENIs). These are small particle accelerators that cause a brief fusion reaction by accelerating deuterium into a tritium target (or potentially vice versa), producing a short pulse of energetic neutrons. Precise timing of the ENI pulse as the nuclear primary's pit is collapsing can significantly affect yield, and the rate of neutron injection can also be controlled.
- Shutting down the thermonuclear secondary, either by firing the primary at low enough yield that it does not compress the secondary sufficiently to ignite, or by blocking energy transport inside the warhead briefly as the primary is firing using shutters or a similar mechanism. If the primary's energy starts to disperse through the radiation case before being focused on the secondary then the secondary will likely never detonate.

All current British nuclear warheads incorporate variable yield technology as standard.

== See also ==
- Nuclear weapon design
