= Extractor =

Extractor may refer to:

- Extractor (firearms)
- Extractor (mathematics)
- Extractor (screws), a tool used to remove broken screws
- Randomness extractor
- Soxhlet extractor
- Exhaust manifold
- Extractors, a 1995 computer game
