= Enduring Stockpile =

United States' arsenal of nuclear weapons post Cold War

The Enduring Stockpile is the name given to the United States' arsenal of nuclear weapons following the end of the Cold War. As of 2025, it comprises approximately 3,700 nuclear weapons.

During the Cold War, the United States produced over 70,000 nuclear weapons. By its end, the U.S. stockpile was about 23,000 weapons of 26 different types. The production of nuclear weapons ended in 1989, and since then existing weapons have been retired, dismantled, or mothballed. In 2021, the Department of Energy website stated the stockpile was the lowest it had been since 1960.

Weapons in the Enduring Stockpile are categorized by level of readiness. The three levels are:

- Active Service: fully operational, connected to a delivery system, and available for immediate use (e.g., LGM-30 Minuteman silo-based ICBMs and UGM-133 Trident II ICBMs onboard ballistic missile submarines)
- Hedge Stockpile: fully operational, but kept in storage; available within minutes or hours; not connected to delivery systems, but delivery systems are available (e.g., missile and bomb stockpiles kept at various Air Force bases)
- Inactive Reserve: not in operational condition and/or do not have immediately available delivery systems, but can be made ready if needed.

US Enduring Stockpile, 2004–present
Type	2004	2025
ICBM	1,490	800
SLBM	2,736	1,920
Bomber	1,660	780
Total strategic	5,886	3,500
Total non-strategic	1,120	200
Total stockpile	~7,000	3,700
Reserved/Retired	~3,000	3,407

As of 2025, the most common warhead in the nuclear arsenal is the W76, installed on the majority of UGM-133 Trident II SLBMs. The only weapon capable of exceeding a 500 kiloton yield is the B83 gravity bomb, delivered by the B-2 Spirit. All are thermonuclear weapons, but the vast majority of weapons derive over 80% of their yield from fission of the primary and tamper, greatly increasing fallout.

Bomber weapons include strategic B61 and B83 gravity bombs, AGM-86 ALCM and several hundred spare warheads. The tactical weapons consist of 800 tactical B61 gravity bombs and 320 nuclear warheads for Tomahawk missiles.

The START II Treaty called for a reduction to a total of 3,500 to 3,000 warheads, but was not ratified by the Russian Duma. The replacement 2002 Strategic Offensive Reductions Treaty delayed reductions to 2012, with a limit of 2,200 operationally deployed warheads. The New START treaty signed in 2010 commits to lowering that limit to 1,550 warheads, and was ratified by the Russian Duma on 26 January 2011. On 5 February 2026, the treaty officially expired.

== See also ==
- Stockpile stewardship – Testing and maintenance of American nuclear weapons
- Nuclear weapons and the United States
- Reliable Replacement Warhead – Proposed US nuclear weapon
- Stockpile – Peacetime stockpile of materiel or strategic raw materials
- Fogbank – Material used in US nuclear weapons
