= Ground burst =

Detonation of an explosive at ground level

Diagram depicting the different stages of a Minuteman III missile path from launch to detonation, with ground burst and airburst at (8).

A ground burst is the detonation of an explosive device such as an artillery shell, nuclear weapon or air-dropped bomb that explodes at ground level. These weapons are set off by fuses that are activated when the weapon strikes the ground or something equally hard, such as a concrete building, or otherwise detonated at the surface.

In the context of a nuclear weapon, a ground burst is a detonation on the ground, in shallow water, or below the fallout-free altitude. This condition produces substantial amounts of nuclear fallout. An air burst or a deep subterranean detonation, by contrast, makes little fallout.

== Ground shock ==
Ground shock, or water shock will result from nuclear explosions on (or near) the surface of ground or water. The ground shock can damage or destroy hardened structures. In water, the shock is damaging to nearby vessels and may also produce a surface wave to limited ranges. A crater is formed by an explosion at (or near) the ground surface. The size of the crater depends on the type of ground material and how close to the ground surface the explosion occurs.

== See also ==
- Air burst
