= List of nuclear weapons tests of France =

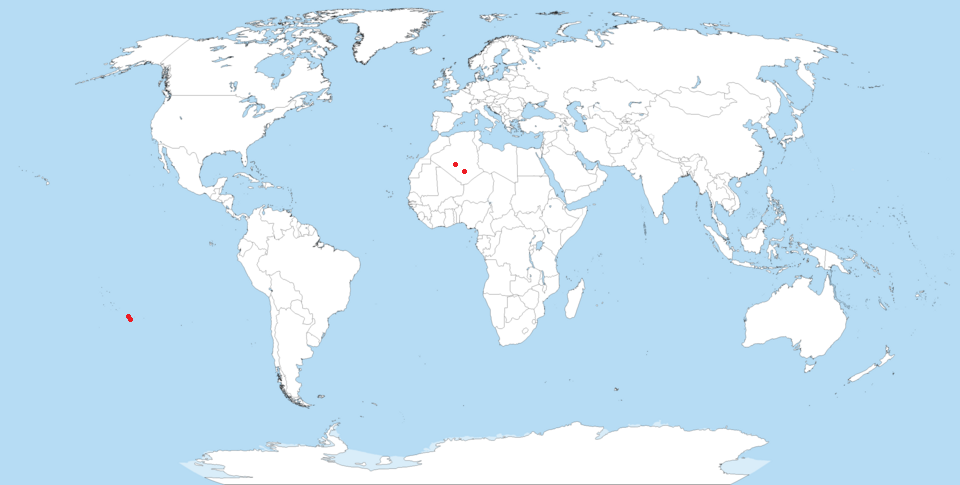
This map shows where France tested their nuclear weapons, shown with red dots.

France executed nuclear weapons tests in the areas of Reggane and In Ekker in Algeria and the Mururoa and Fangataufa Atolls in French Polynesia, from 13 February 1960 through 27 January 1996. These totaled 210 tests with 210 device explosions, 50 in the atmosphere.

== List ==
France's nuclear testing series summary
Series or years	Years covered	Tests (Note: Includes all tests with potential for nuclear fission or fusion explosion, including combat use, singleton tests, salvo tests, zero yield fails, safety experiments, and bombs incapacitated by accidents but still intended to be fired. It does not include hydronuclear and subcritical tests, and misfires of a device which was subsequently fired successfully.)	Devices fired	Devices with unknown yield	Peaceful use tests	Non-PTBT tests (Note: Number of tests which would have been in violation of the Partial Test Ban Treaty of 1963, such as atmospheric, space or underwater tests. Some "peaceful use" cratering tests which should have been violations were protested, and later quietly dropped.)	Yield range (kilotons) (Note: "Small" refers to a value greater than zero but less than 0.5 kt.)	Total yield (kilotons) (Note: Some yields are described like "< 20 kt"; such are scored at one half of the numeric amount, i.e., yield of 10k in this example. "Unknown yield" adds nothing to the total.)	Notes
Reggane	1960	4	4			4	1 to 70	78	A series of 4 atmospheric nuclear tests conducted in Reggane. Included the first nuclear test by France, Gerboise Bleue.
In Ekker	1961–1966	13	13		4		0 to 127	286	Series of underground nuclear testing conducted in In Ekker. Radioactive fallout was leaked throughout multiple of the tests.
1966–1970	1966–1970	22	22			22	0 to 2,600	8,044	Series of atmospheric nuclear tests conducted at Moruroa Atoll and Fangataufa Atoll. Included France's first and most powerful thermonuclear test, Canopus.
1971–1974	1971–1974	24	24			24	0 to 955	2,082	Second series of atmospheric nuclear tests conducted at Moruroa and Fangataufa.
1975–1978	1975–1978	27	27				0 to 64	259	First series of underground nuclear tests conducted at Moruroa and Fangataufa.
1979–1980	1979–1980	22	22				0 to 112	474	
1981–1982	1981–1982	22	22				0 to 56	195	
1983–1985	1983–1985	25	25				0,25 to 80	537	
1986–1988	1986–1988	24	24				2 to 103	625	
1989–1991	1989–1991	21	21				0 to 118	755	
1995–1996	1995–1996	6	6				8 to 120	268	Last series of nuclear tests conducted by France. France signed the Comprehensive Nuclear-Test-Ban Treaty after the last test of the series, Xouthos.
Totals	1960, Feb 13 to 1996, Jan 27	210	210		4	55	0 to 2,600	13,567	Total country yield is 2.5% of all nuclear testing.

== See also ==
- List of nuclear weapons tests
- Force de dissuasion

== Sources ==
- Yang, Xiaoping; North, Robert; Romney, Carl (August 2000). "CMR Nuclear Explosion Database (Revision 3)". SMDC Monitoring Research.
- Andryushi, LA; Voloshin, N.P.; Ilkaev, R.I.; Matushchenko, A.M.; Ryabev, L.D.; Strukov, V.G.; Chernyshev, A.K.; Yudin, Yu.A. Mikhailov, V.N. (ed.). "Catalog of Worldwide Nuclear Testing". Archived from the original on 2013-12-19.
- Wm Robert Johnston, PhD. "Johnston Archive of Nuclear Weapons".
