= Gerboise Verte =

1961 atmospheric nuclear weapons test in Reggane, French Algeria

- Location within Algeria

Information
- Country: France
- Test series: Reggane series
- Test site: Reggane, French Algeria
- Coordinates: 26°19′18″N 0°04′24″W
- Date: 25 April 1961; 65 years ago
- Test type: Atmospheric
- Test altitude: 50 m
- Device type: A-bomb
- Yield: 0.7–1.2 kt

Test chronology

Gerboise Verte (French pronunciation: [ʒɛʁbwaz vɛʁt]; lit. 'Green Jerboa') is the codename for a French nuclear test conducted on 25 April 1961. The test took place at the Centre Saharien d'Expérimentations Militaires (CSEM), 50 km south of Reggane, Algeria, then a French department and was designed as an atmospheric test. This was the fourth French nuclear atmospheric test, after Gerboise Bleue, Gerboise Blanche, and Gerboise Rouge.

== History ==
In 1957, the French government decided to create experimental nuclear testing facilities in the Sahara. To this end, 108,000 square kilometers of land were allocated to the French Ministry of Defense for the first French nuclear experiments. The Centre Saharien d'Expérimentations Militaires (CSEM) for atmospheric testing was set up in Hamoudia some 50 km south of Reggane, an oasis in the south of the Grand Erg Occidental, 700 km from Colomb Béchar. The Centre d'Expérimentations Militaires des Oasis (CEMO) was later built in the Hoggar Mountains, near In Ekker, 150 km north of Tamanrasset, to carry out underground nuclear tests. Between 1960 and 1966, France carried out 4 atmospheric tests and 13 underground tests in the Sahara.

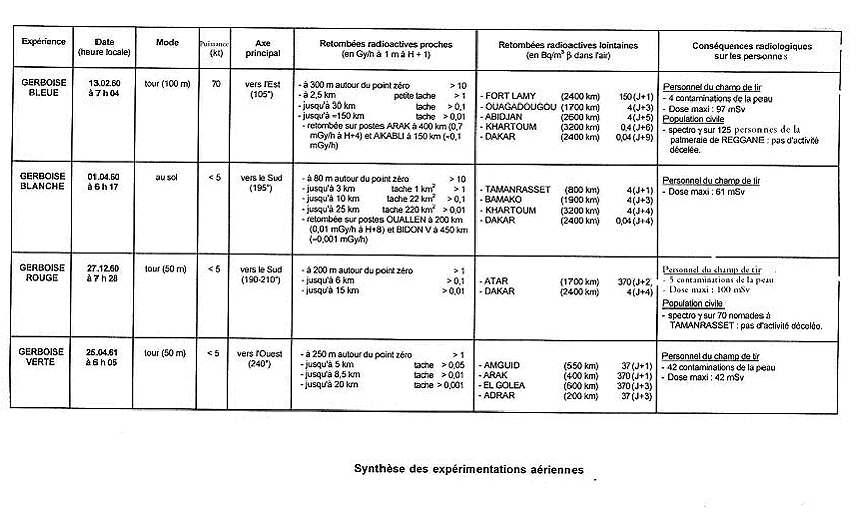
Synthesis of the aerial nuclear tests at the CSEM

From 13 February 1960 to 25 April 1961, France carried out the Reggane series of four atmospheric tests, Gerboise Bleue, Gerboise Blanche, Gerboise Rouge, and Gerboise Verte, at the CSEM. For these tests, with the exception of the Gerboise Blanche, the explosive device to be tested was placed in a shelter at the top of a tower. For the Gerboise Blanche, the low-power explosive device was placed on a platform at ground level.

The French government hastily ordered the detonation of Gerboise Verte on 25 April 1961 immediately following the generals' putsch, so that the nuclear device could not fall into the hands of the putschists.

Gerboise Verte was tested at 26°19′18″N 0°04′24″W. From a technical point of view, Gerboise Verte was a failure. Installed on a 50-meter tower, the bomb was designed with an estimated yield between 6 and 18 kilotons, but only had a yield of around 1 kiloton in the test. Yves Rocard recounts that meteorological precautions were not taken, so much so that the bomb was tested in a sandstorm whose intensity masked even the light of the explosion.

Like Gerboise Rouge, a joint exercise in the contaminated area, codenamed Garigliano was conducted to see how infantrymen and armored vehicles could protect themselves and then operate after the explosion. Conscripts from the contingent played the role of guinea pigs. Shortly after the test, they were sent to a contaminated zone to shelter in manholes 800 meters (1/2mile) from the point of impact or in 4 × 4 trucks.

The doses received by the participants in these maneuvers were low, well below the annual limits of 50 millisieverts (mSv) in force at the time: for the helicopter crews guiding the ground troops, they were between 1 and 5 mSv; for the crews of the armoured vehicles, they were of the order of 0.5 mSv, with the exception of one person who had received a dose of 10 mSv; for infantrymen, they were about 2 mSv, i.e. twenty-fifth of the regulatory annual limits of the time for professionals and a tenth of the current limit value. At no time did the command pose a health risk to its troops, either at the time of firing or during post-firing maneuvers

An urban legend holds that the bomb was transported from a warehouse in the port of Algiers to Reggane (1,500 km) in a Citroën 2CV. According to witnesses, only the plutonium core (the "pit") traveled in a 2CV and only between Reggane and the CSEM the night preceding the explosion.

== Popular culture ==
The novelist Christophe Bataille published a story in January 2015 based on this nuclear test: L'Expérience (Grasset).

The event is represented in episode 6 of season 2 of the series A Very Secret Service.

== See also ==
- List of nuclear weapons tests of France
