= 1971–74 French nuclear tests =

1971–1974

Information
- Country: France
- Test site: Colette zone, Moruroa Atoll; Denise zone, Moruroa Atoll; Dindon zone, Moruroa Atoll; Muroroa Atoll, Pacific Test Area (CEP)
- Period: 1971–1974
- Number of tests: 24
- Test type: air drop, balloon, dry surface
- Max. yield: 955 kilotonnes of TNT (4,000 TJ)

Test series chronology

France carried out a series of 24 nuclear tests from 1971 to 1974 These tests followed the 1966–1970 French nuclear tests series and preceded the 1975–1978 French nuclear tests.

France's 1971–1974 series tests and detonations
Name (Note: The US, France and Great Britain codenamed their test events, while the USSR and China did not, and therefore have only test numbers (with some exceptions – Soviet peaceful explosions were named). Word translations into English in parentheses unless the name is a proper noun. A dash followed by a number indicates a member of a salvo event. The US also sometimes named the individual explosions in such a salvo test, which results in "name1 – 1(with name2)". If test is canceled or aborted, then the row data like date and location discloses the intended plans, where known.)	Date time (UT)	Local time zone (Note: To convert the UT time into standard local, add the number of hours in parentheses to the UT time; for local daylight saving time, add one additional hour. If the result is earlier than 00:00, add 24 hours and subtract 1 from the day; if it is 24:00 or later, subtract 24 hours and add 1 to the day.)	Location (Note: Rough place name and a latitude/longitude reference; for rocket-carried tests, the launch location is specified before the detonation location, if known. Some locations are extremely accurate; others (like airdrops and space blasts) may be quite inaccurate. "~" indicates a likely pro-forma rough location, shared with other tests in that same area.)	Elevation + height (Note: Elevation is the ground level at the point directly below the explosion relative to sea level; height is the additional distance added or subtracted by tower, balloon, shaft, tunnel, air drop or other contrivance. For rocket bursts the ground level is "N/A". In some cases it is not clear if the height is absolute or relative to ground, for example, Plumbbob/John. No number or units indicates the value is unknown, while "0" means zero. Sorting on this column is by elevation and height added together.)	Delivery, (Note: Atmospheric, airdrop, balloon, gun, cruise missile, rocket, surface, tower, and barge are all disallowed by the Partial Nuclear Test Ban Treaty. Sealed shaft and tunnel are underground, and remained useful under the PTBT. Intentional cratering tests are borderline; they occurred under the treaty, were sometimes protested, and generally overlooked if the test was declared to be a peaceful use.) Purpose (Note: Include weapons development, weapon effects, safety test, transport safety test, war, science, joint verification and industrial/peaceful, which may be further broken down.)	Device (Note: Designations for test items where known, "?" indicates some uncertainty about the preceding value, nicknames for particular devices in quotes. This category of information is often not officially disclosed.)	Yield (Note: Estimated energy yield in tons, kilotons, and megatons. A ton of TNT equivalent is defined as 4.184 gigajoules (1 gigacalorie).)	Fallout (Note: Radioactive emission to the atmosphere aside from prompt neutrons, where known. The measured species is only iodine-131 if mentioned, otherwise it is all species. No entry means unknown, probably none if underground and "all" if not; otherwise notation for whether measured on the site only or off the site, where known, and the measured amount of radioactivity released.)	References	Notes
Dioné	5 June 1971 19:15:??	TAHT (–10 hrs)	Denise zone, Moruroa Atoll: Denise ~ 21.83°S 138.88°W	5 m (16 ft) + 275 m (902 ft)	balloon, weapons development	AN-51	34 kt			
Encelade	12 June 1971 19:14:57.3	TAHT (–10 hrs)	Dindon zone, Moruroa Atoll: Dindon 21.80316°S 138.91391°W	5 m (16 ft) + 450 m (1,480 ft)	balloon, weapons development	MR-41	440 kt			Induced fallout over Tureia.
Japet	4 July 1971 21:30:??	TAHT (–10 hrs)	Denise zone, Moruroa Atoll: Denise ~ 21.83°S 138.88°W	5 m (16 ft) + 230 m (750 ft)	balloon, weapons development	TN-60	9 kt			
Phoebé	8 August 1971 18:30:??	TAHT (–10 hrs)	Denise zone, Moruroa Atoll: Denise ~ 21.83°S 138.88°W	5 m (16 ft) + 230 m (750 ft)	balloon, weapons development	TN-60	4 kt			
Rhéa	14 August 1971 19:00:00.8	TAHT (–10 hrs)	Dindon zone, Moruroa Atoll: Dindon 21.874726°S 139.006115°W	5 m (16 ft) + 480 m (1,570 ft)	balloon, weapons development	TN-60	955 kt			
Umbriel	25 June 1972 19:00:??	TAHT (–10 hrs)	Denise zone, Moruroa Atoll: Denise ~ 21.83°S 138.88°W	5 m (16 ft) + 230 m (750 ft)	balloon, weapons development	TN-60	500 t			
Titania	30 June 1972 18:30:??	TAHT (–10 hrs)	Dindon zone, Moruroa Atoll: Dindon ~ 21.83°S 138.88°W	5 m (16 ft) + 220 m (720 ft)	balloon, weapons development	TN-60	4 kt			
Obéron	27 July 1972 18:40:??	TAHT (–10 hrs)	Dindon zone, Moruroa Atoll: Dindon ~ 21.83°S 138.88°W	5 m (16 ft) + 220 m (720 ft)	balloon, weapons development	TN-60	6 kt			
Ariel	31 July 1972 22:30:??	TAHT (–10 hrs)	Colette zone, Moruroa Atoll: Colette ~ 21.78131°S 138.90472°W	5 m (16 ft) + 10 m (33 ft)	dry surface, safety experiment	TN-60 ?	1000 kg			Some report that this was a safety experiment.
Euterpe	21 July 1973 18:00:??	TAHT (–10 hrs)	Dindon zone, Moruroa Atoll: Dindon ~ 21.83°S 138.88°W	5 m (16 ft) + 220 m (720 ft)	balloon, weapons development	TN-60	11 kt			
Melpomène	28 July 1973 23:06:??	TAHT (–10 hrs)	Denise zone, Moruroa Atoll: Denise ~ 21.83°S 138.88°W	5 m (16 ft) + 270 m (890 ft)	balloon, weapons development	TN-60 ?	50 t			
Pallas	18 August 1973 18:15:??	TAHT (–10 hrs)	Denise zone, Moruroa Atoll: Denise ~ 21.83°S 138.88°W	5 m (16 ft) + 270 m (890 ft)	balloon, weapons development	TN-60 ?	4 kt			
Parthénope	24 August 1973 18:00:??	TAHT (–10 hrs)	Dindon zone, Moruroa Atoll: Dindon ~ 21.83°S 138.88°W	5 m (16 ft) + 220 m (720 ft)	balloon, weapons development	TN-60 ?	200 t			
Tamara	28 August 1973 18:30:??	TAHT (–10 hrs)	Muroroa Atoll, Pacific Test Area (CEP): 26 km W 21.88862°S 139.277°W	5 m (16 ft) + 250 m (820 ft)	air drop, weapons development	AN-52	6.6 kt			Dropped by a Mirage 3 jet (Mirage III E sn 617).
Vesta	13 September 1973 15:42:??	TAHT (–10 hrs)	Colette zone, Moruroa Atoll: Colette ~ 21.78122°S 138.90476°W	0.1 m (3.9 in) + 4 m (13 ft)	dry surface, safety experiment		no yield			
Capricorne	16 June 1974 17:30:??	TAHT (–10 hrs)	Dindon zone, Moruroa Atoll: Dindon ~ 21.83°S 138.88°W	5 m (16 ft) + 220 m (720 ft)	balloon, weapons development	TN-70 ?	4 kt			
Bélier	1 July 1974 17:30:??	TAHT (–10 hrs)	Colette zone, Moruroa Atoll: Colette ~ 21.78126°S 138.90472°W	0.6 m (2 ft 0 in) + 5 m (16 ft)	dry surface, safety experiment		no yield			
Gémeaux	7 July 1974 23:15:??	TAHT (–10 hrs)	Dindon zone, Moruroa Atoll: Dindon ~ 21.83°S 138.88°W	5 m (16 ft) + 312 m (1,024 ft)	balloon, weapons development	TN-70 ?	150 kt			
Centaure	17 July 1974 17:00:??	TAHT (–10 hrs)	Denise zone, Moruroa Atoll: Denise ~ 21.83°S 138.88°W	5 m (16 ft) + 270 m (890 ft)	balloon, weapons development	TN-80 ?	4 kt			
Maquis	25 July 1974 17:30:??	TAHT (–10 hrs)	Muroroa Atoll, Pacific Test Area (CEP): 17 km WSW 21.95429°S 139.17013°W	5 m (16 ft) + 250 m (820 ft)	air drop, weapons development	AN-52	8 kt			Dropped by a Jaguar A jet (Jaguar A sn 17).
Persée	28 July 1974 17:30:??	TAHT (–10 hrs)	Colette zone, Moruroa Atoll: Colette ~ 21.78122°S 138.90474°W	0.6 m (2 ft 0 in) + 5 m (16 ft)	dry surface, safety experiment		1000 kg			Some report that this was a safety experiment.
Scorpion	14 August 1974 00:30:??	TAHT (–10 hrs)	Dindon zone, Moruroa Atoll: Dindon ~ 21.83°S 138.88°W	5 m (16 ft) + 312 m (1,024 ft)	balloon, weapons development		96 kt			
Taureau	24 August 1974 23:45:??	TAHT (–10 hrs)	Denise zone, Moruroa Atoll: Denise ~ 21.83°S 138.88°W	5 m (16 ft) + 270 m (890 ft)	balloon, weapons development		14 kt			
Verseau	14 September 1974 23:30:??	TAHT (–10 hrs)	Dindon zone, Moruroa Atoll: Dindon 21.871°S 139.01°W	5 m (16 ft) + 433 m (1,421 ft)	balloon, weapons development	TN-60 ?	332 kt			Last French atmospheric nuclear test. France moved on with underground tests at the Pacific Experiment Centre.
