= 1966–70 French nuclear tests =

Series of French nuclear tests

1966–1970

Information
- Country: France
- Test site: Colette zone, Moruroa Atoll; Denise zone, Moruroa Atoll; Dindon zone, Moruroa Atoll; Fregate Zone, Fangataufa Atoll; Muroroa Atoll, Pacific Test Area (CEP)
- Period: 1966–1970
- Number of tests: 22
- Test type: air drop, balloon, barge, dry surface
- Max. yield: 2.6 megatonnes of TNT (11 PJ)

Test series chronology

The France's 1966–1970 nuclear test series was a group of 22 nuclear tests conducted in 1966–1970. These tests followed the In Ekker series and preceded the 1971–1974 French nuclear tests series.

France's 1966–1970 series tests and detonations
Name (Note: The United States, France and Great Britain have code-named their test events, while the USSR and China did not, and therefore have only test numbers (with some exceptions – Soviet peaceful explosions were named). Word translations into English in parentheses unless the name is a proper noun. A dash followed by a number indicates a member of a salvo event. The US also sometimes named the individual explosions in such a salvo test, which results in "name1 – 1(with name2)". If test is canceled or aborted, then the row data like date and location discloses the intended plans, where known.)	Date time (UT)	Local time zone (Note: To convert the UT time into standard local, add the number of hours in parentheses to the UT time; for local daylight saving time, add one additional hour. If the result is earlier than 00:00, add 24 hours and subtract 1 from the day; if it is 24:00 or later, subtract 24 hours and add 1 to the day. Historical time zone data obtained from the IANA time zone database.)	Location (Note: Rough place name and a latitude/longitude reference; for rocket-carried tests, the launch location is specified before the detonation location, if known. Some locations are extremely accurate; others (like airdrops and space blasts) may be quite inaccurate. "~" indicates a likely pro-forma rough location, shared with other tests in that same area.)	Elevation + height (Note: Elevation is the ground level at the point directly below the explosion relative to sea level; height is the additional distance added or subtracted by tower, balloon, shaft, tunnel, air drop or other contrivance. For rocket bursts the ground level is "N/A". In some cases it is not clear if the height is absolute or relative to ground, for example, Plumbbob/John. No number or units indicates the value is unknown, while "0" means zero. Sorting on this column is by elevation and height added together.)	Delivery, (Note: Atmospheric, airdrop, balloon, gun, cruise missile, rocket, surface, tower, and barge are all disallowed by the Partial Nuclear Test Ban Treaty. Sealed shaft and tunnel are underground, and remained useful under the PTBT. Intentional cratering tests are borderline; they occurred under the treaty, were sometimes protested, and generally overlooked if the test was declared to be a peaceful use.) Purpose (Note: Include weapons development, weapon effects, safety test, transport safety test, war, science, joint verification and industrial/peaceful, which may be further broken down.)	Device (Note: Designations for test items where known, "?" indicates some uncertainty about the preceding value, nicknames for particular devices in quotes. This category of information is often not officially disclosed.)	Yield (Note: Estimated energy yield in tons, kilotons, and megatons. A ton of TNT equivalent is defined as 4.184 gigajoules (1 gigacalorie).)	Fallout (Note: Radioactive emission to the atmosphere aside from prompt neutrons, where known. The measured species is only iodine-131 if mentioned, otherwise it is all species. No entry means unknown, probably none if underground and "all" if not; otherwise notation for whether measured on the site only or off the site, where known, and the measured amount of radioactivity released.)	References	Notes
Aldébaran	2 July 1966 15:34:??	TAHT (–10 hr)	Dindon zone, Moruroa Atoll: Dindon ~ 21.868611°S 139.001944°W	−35 m (−115 ft) + 10 m (33 ft)	barge, weapons development	AN-52	28 kt			An experimental tactical weapon. Fired on the third try.
Tamouré	19 July 1966 15:05:??	TAHT (–10 hr)	Muroroa Atoll, Pacific Test Area (CEP): 85 km E 21.743649°S 138.002247°W	5 m (16 ft) + 1,000 m (3,300 ft)	air drop, weapons development	AN-11	50 kt			Dropped by a Mirage IV jet (Mirage IV A sn 9), France's first dropped tests.
Ganymède	21 July 1966 12:00:??	TAHT (–10 hr)	Colette zone, Moruroa Atoll: Colette ~ 21.780835°S 138.903544°W	5 m (16 ft) + 12 m (39 ft)	dry surface, safety experiment	AN-22	no yield			
Bételgeuse	11 September 1966 17:30:??	TAHT (–10 hr)	Denise zone, Moruroa Atoll: Denise ~ 21.791667°S 138.892500°W	5 m (16 ft) + 470 m (1,540 ft)	balloon, weapons development	MR-31	110 kt			Contrary to popular belief, the radiological fallout moved to the northeast without causing radioactive contamination of the civilian population.
Rigel	24 September 1966 17:00:??	TAHT (–10 hr)	Fregate Zone, Fangataufa Atoll: Fregate 22.240001°S 138.722784°W	−35 m (−115 ft) + 3 m (9.8 ft)	barge, weapons development		125 kt			Boosted fission device.
Sirius	4 October 1966 21:00:??	TAHT (–10 hr)	Dindon zone, Moruroa Atoll: Dindon ~ 21.871667°S 139.003333°W	−35 m (−115 ft) + 10 m (33 ft)	barge, weapons development		205 kt			
Altair	5 June 1967 19:00:??	TAHT (–10 hr)	Denise zone, Moruroa Atoll: Denise 21.789°S 138.895°W	5 m (16 ft) + 295 m (968 ft)	balloon, weapons development		15 kt			
Antarès	27 June 1967 18:30:??	TAHT (–10 hr)	Dindon zone, Moruroa Atoll: Dindon 21.865°S 139°W	5 m (16 ft) + 340 m (1,120 ft)	balloon, weapons development		120 kt			
Arcturus	2 July 1967 17:30:??	TAHT (–10 hr)	Denise zone, Moruroa Atoll: Denise 21.786389°S 138.892500°W	−35 m (−115 ft) + 3 m (9.8 ft)	barge, weapons development		22 kt			Intended for a balloon, instead detonated at ground level, resulting in severe downwind fallout.
Capella	7 July 1968 22:00:??	TAHT (–10 hr)	Denise zone, Moruroa Atoll: Denise ~ 21.83°S 138.88°W	5 m (16 ft) + 463 m (1,519 ft)	balloon, weapons development		115 kt			
Castor	15 July 1968 19:00:??	TAHT (–10 hr)	Dindon zone, Moruroa Atoll: Dindon ~ 21.83°S 138.88°W	5 m (16 ft) + 650 m (2,130 ft)	balloon, weapons development	MR-41	450 kt			
Pollux	3 August 1968 21:00:??	TAHT (–10 hr)	Denise zone, Moruroa Atoll: Denise ~ 21.83°S 138.88°W	5 m (16 ft) + 490 m (1,610 ft)	balloon, weapons development	MR-41	150 kt			
Canopus	24 August 1968 18:30:00.5	TAHT (–10 hr)	Fregate Zone, Fangataufa Atoll: Fregate 22.243336°S 138.725009°W	5 m (16 ft) + 520 m (1,710 ft)	balloon, weapons development		2.6 Mt			First French thermonuclear detonation. It contaminated Fangataufa so highly that it lay unused for the next six years.
Procyon	8 September 1968 19:00:01	TAHT (–10 hr)	Dindon zone, Moruroa Atoll: Dindon 21.821°S 138.975°W	5 m (16 ft) + 700 m (2,300 ft)	balloon, weapons development		1.3 Mt			
Andromède	15 May 1970 18:00:??	TAHT (–10 hr)	Denise zone, Moruroa Atoll: Denise ~ 21.83°S 138.88°W	5 m (16 ft) + 220 m (720 ft)	balloon, weapons development		13 kt			
Cassiopée	22 May 1970 18:30:??	TAHT (–10 hr)	Dindon zone, Moruroa Atoll: Dindon ~ 21.83°S 138.88°W	5 m (16 ft) + 500 m (1,600 ft)	balloon, weapons development	TN-60	224 kt			
Dragon	30 May 1970 17:59:59.9	TAHT (–10 hr)	Fregate Zone, Fangataufa Atoll: Fregate 22.239176°S 138.723889°W	5 m (16 ft) + 500 m (1,600 ft)	balloon, weapons development		945 kt			
Eridan	24 June 1970 18:30:??	TAHT (–10 hr)	Denise zone, Moruroa Atoll: Denise ~ 21.83°S 138.88°W	5 m (16 ft) + 220 m (720 ft)	balloon, weapons development		12 kt			
Licorne	3 July 1970 18:30:00.3	TAHT (–10 hr)	Dindon zone, Moruroa Atoll: Dindon 21.80802°S 138.91727°W	5 m (16 ft) + 500 m (1,600 ft)	balloon, weapons development	TN-60	914 kt			Six hours after the test, French Defense Minister Michel Debré swam in the lagoon as a PR ploy.
Pégase	27 July 1970 19:00:??	TAHT (–10 hr)	Denise zone, Moruroa Atoll: Denise ~ 21.83°S 138.88°W	5 m (16 ft) + 220 m (720 ft)	balloon, weapons development		50 t			
Orion	2 August 1970 19:00:??	TAHT (–10 hr)	Fregate Zone, Fangataufa Atoll: Fregate 22.233889°S 138.716944°W	5 m (16 ft) + 400 m (1,300 ft)	balloon, weapons development		72 kt			
Toucan	6 August 1970 19:00:??	TAHT (–10 hr)	Dindon zone, Moruroa Atoll: Dindon ~ 21.83°S 138.88°W	5 m (16 ft) + 500 m (1,600 ft)	balloon, weapons development		594 kt			
