= Agate (nuclear test) =

1961 weapons test in In Ekker, French Algeria

- Location within Algeria

Information
- Country: France
- Test series: In Ekker series
- Test site: In Ekker, French Algeria
- Coordinates: 24°03′55″N 5°03′23″E
- Date: 7 November 1961; 64 years ago
- Test type: Atmospheric
- Test altitude: 1,000 m
- Device type: Fission bomb
- Yield: 10 kt (41.84 TJ)

Test chronology

Agate (Note: Some sources report the name Agathe; however, it is a misspelling of the rock formation after which the bomb was named.) was the codename of the first French nuclear underground test. It was conducted by the Joint Special Weapons Command on 7 November 1961, at the Oasis Military Experiments Centre near In Ekker, French Algeria at the Tan Afella in the Hoggar Mountains, during the Algerian War.

It is named after the Agate, a rock formation used in jewelry.

== History ==
Agate was the first test of the jewel designation series running from 1961 until 1966. Minor and major incidents occurred during these experiments, the most important being the Béryl incident on May 1, 1962, where the nine militarymen of the 621ème Groupe d'Armes Spéciales unit were heavily contaminated (600 mSv) as portrayed in the 2006 docudrama Vive La Bombe!. The French Defence Minister Pierre Messmer and other officials and civilians were present in the command post and were contaminated too (around >200 mSv).

== Programme ==
(Bracketed terms link to the correspondingly named gemstones.)

- 1961-11-07: Agate (Agate): 10 kt
- 1962-05-01: Béryl (Beryl): 40 kt
- 1963-03-18: Émeraude (Emerald): 10 kt
- 1963-03-30: Améthyste (Amethyst): 2.5 kt
- 1963-10-20: Rubis (Ruby): 52 kt
- 1964-02-14: Opale (Opal): 3.7 kt
- 1964-06-15: Topaze (Topaz): 2.5 kt
- 1964-11-28: Turquoise (Turquoise): 10 kt
- 1965-02-27: Saphir (Sapphire): 127 kt
- 1965-05-30: Jade (Jade): 2.5 kt
- 1965-10-01: Corindon (Corundum): 2.5 kt
- 1965-12-01: Tourmaline (Tourmaline): 10 kt
- 1966-02-16: Grenat (Garnet): 13 kt

=== Known incidents ===
The millisievert (mSv) is commonly used to measure the effective dose in diagnostic medical procedures. See radiation poisoning for a more complete analysis of effects of various dosage levels.

- 1962-05-01: Béryl casualties

100 pers. (>50 mSv)
15 pers. (>200 mSv)
9 pers. (600 mSv)
possibly 240 pers. (<2.5 mSv)

- 1963-03-30: Améthyste casualties

13 pers. (=10 mSv)
280 pers. (<1 mSv)

- 1963-10-20: Rubis casualties

500 pers. (<0.2 mSv)
undisclosed (= 0.01 mSv)

- 1965-05-30 Jade casualties:

undisclosed (<1 mSv)

Data provided by the French Defense Ministry in January 2007.

== See also ==
- Gerboise Bleue (French first atmospheric A-bomb)
- Canopus (French first atmospheric H-bomb)
- Force de Frappe
- List of states with nuclear weapons
- Nuclear weapons and France
- History of nuclear weapons
