= Reggane series =

French nuclear tests in Algeria

- Location within Algeria

Information
- Country: France
- Test site: Reggane, French Algeria
- Coordinates: 26°18′42″N 00°03′26″W
- Period: 1960–1961
- Number of tests: 4
- Test type: Atmospheric
- Device type: A-bombs
- Max. yield: 70 kt (292.88 TJ)

Test series chronology

The Reggane series was a group of 4 atmospheric A-bomb nuclear tests conducted by France between February 1960 and April 1961, close to the end of the Algerian War. The bombs were detonated at the Saharan Military Experiments Centre near Reggane, French Algeria in the Sahara desert region of Tanezrouft, by the Nuclear Experiments Operational Group (GOEN), a unit of the Joint Special Weapons Command. The series saw the explosion of the first French nuclear weapon and was followed by the In Ekker series.

The French authorities claimed that the tests took place in an uninhabited area, but at least 27,000 people living in the vicinity were negatively impacted. The radioactive fallout caused elevated levels of skin cancer, birth defects, organ cancers and blindness among the local population.

== Codenames ==
All four operations were named after the jerboa (Gerboise), a desert rodent found in the Sahara, with the adjunction of a colour. The first three colours adjuncted (blue, white and red) are said to come from the French Flag.

== Chart of the tests ==
Codename	Date time (UTC)	Location	Elevation	Altitude	Delivery	Purpose	Device	Yield	Fallouts (Note: Original 60's numbers are in rad/h and were converted to Gy/h, the SI derived unit for ionizing radiation dose.)
Gerboise Bleue	1960-02-13 – 07:04:00.0	CESM, Reggane, French Algeria; 26°18′42″N 00°03′26″W	235 m	+100 m	Tower	First nuclear weapon; Weapon effect	M1 (Note: Emergency device P1 (later used for Gerboise Blanche) ready had M1 failed.)	70.0 kt	After 1 hour : 0.100 Gy/h (0.8 km); 0.100 Gy/h (28.5 km); 0.030 Gy/h (570.0 km)
Gerboise Blanche	1960-04-01 – 06:17:00.0	CESM, Reggane, French Algeria; 26°09′58″N 00°06′09″W	235 m	0 m	Concrete pad	Miniaturization; Weapon development	P1	3.0 kt	After 1 hour : 1.000 Gy/h (3.0 km); 0.003 Gy/h (45.0 km)
Gerboise Rouge	1960-12-27 – 07:30:00.0	CESM, Reggane, French Algeria; 26°21′11″N 00°07′24″W	235 m	+50 m	Tower	Effect on materiel and animals; Military exercise (Note: Followed by Operation Augias 1.)	P2	2.0 kt	After 1 hour : 0.010 Gy/h (0.8 km); 0.100 Gy/h (>6.0 km)
Gerboise Verte	1961-04-25 – 06:00:00.0	CESM, Reggane, French Algeria; 26°19′15″N 00°04′24″W	235 m	+50 m	Tower	Reportedly voluntary sabotage following Algiers Putsch; Military exercise (Note: Followed by Operations Augias 2 & 3.)	R1	0.7 kt	After 1 hour : 0.050 Gy/h (1.1 km)
References :

== Human impact ==
The French authorities claimed that the tests took place in uninhabited areas, but thousands of people lived in the vicinity and were not properly warned of the tests.

The tests left "a legacy of uncontained radiation that is still crippling inhabitants", with the radioactive plutonium causing higher levels of skin cancer and other afflictions.

During the 1970s, babies in southern Algeria began to be born with birth defects, including atrophied limbs, while those that had witnessed the tests were affected by organ cancers and blindness.

France's Ministry of Defence estimated that 27,000 Algerians were impacted by the test, although there were a total of 60,000 people living in the area at the time.

== See also ==
- List of nuclear weapons tests of France
- Nuclear weapons and France
- Force de Frappe
- History of nuclear weapons
