= Gerboise Rouge =

1961 weapons test in Reggane, French Algeria

- Location within Algeria

Information
- Country: France
- Test series: Reggane series
- Test site: Reggane, French Algeria
- Coordinates: 26°21′13″N 0°07′25″W
- Date: 27 December 1960; 65 years ago
- Test type: Atmospheric
- Test altitude: 50 m
- Device type: A-bomb

Test chronology

Gerboise Rouge (French pronunciation: [ʒɛʁbwaz ʁuʒ]; lit. 'Red Jerboa') is the codename for a French nuclear test conducted on 27 December 1960 in Reggane, Algeria. This was the 3rd French nuclear test, after Gerboise Bleue and Gerboise Blanche, completing the colors of the French flag.

During this test, the army carried out experiments on animals, such as goats or mice, which were in Reggane.

== Location ==
Gerboise Rouge was conducted at 26°21′13″N 0°07′25″W.

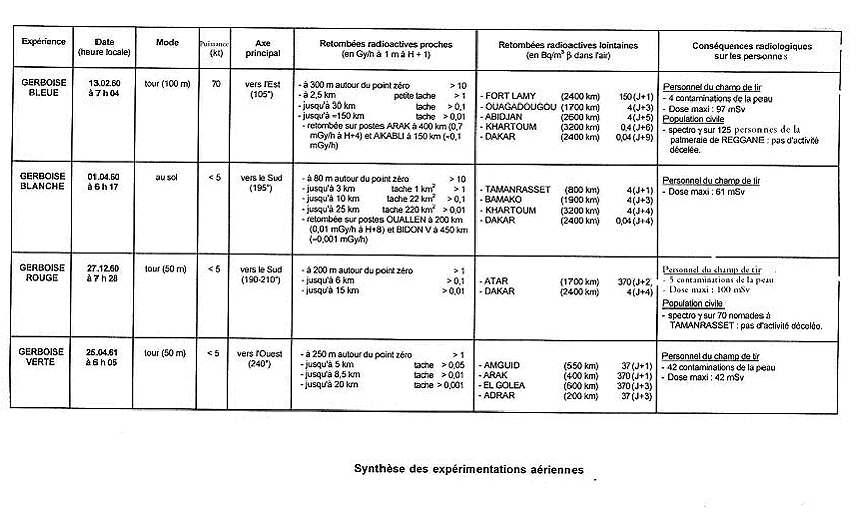
Synthesis of the aerial nuclear tests at the CSEM
