= Gerboise Blanche =

1960 weapons test in Reggane, French Algeria

- Location within Algeria

Information
- Country: France
- Test series: Reggane series
- Test site: Reggane, French Algeria
- Coordinates: 26°09′58″N 00°06′09″W
- Date: 1 April 1960; 66 years ago
- Test type: Atmospheric
- Test altitude: 0 m
- Device type: A-bomb
- Yield: 3 kt (12.5 TJ) (Note: Physicist Pierre Billaud reported a yield of 4 kt (16.7 TJ). See External links.)

Test chronology

Gerboise Blanche (or Opération Gerboise Blanche) was the codename of the second French nuclear test. It was conducted by the Nuclear Experiments Operational Group (GOEN), a unit of the Joint Special Weapons Command on 1 April 1960, at the Saharan Military Experiments Centre near Reggane, French Algeria in the Sahara desert region of Tanezrouft, during the Algerian War.

== Name ==
Gerboise is the French word for jerboa, a desert rodent found in the Sahara. The color white (Blanche) adjuncted is said to come from the second colour of the French Flag.

== Test ==
=== Explosion ===
Gerboise Blanche operation was carried out 3 months after the success of the first test, Gerboise Bleue. Unlike the first attempt and the two others that were to come, this bomb was placed a few kilometres from ground zero, and detonated on a concrete pad. This was a voluntary act of the authorities as they feared the usual test site would have been too contaminated for the next tests.

On 1 April 1960 at 6:17:00 UTC, the 1,250 kg plutonium filled fission bomb was detonated with a yield of 3 kt. The explosion created a crater that was later filled in. The Ministry of the Armed Forces subsequently asserted that the test paved the way for the miniaturization of this type of weapon, and that the lower yield was voluntary. A 2001 document of the National Assembly confirmed this assertion while claiming that the bomb was an "emergency device" that would have been used had Gerboise Bleue failed.

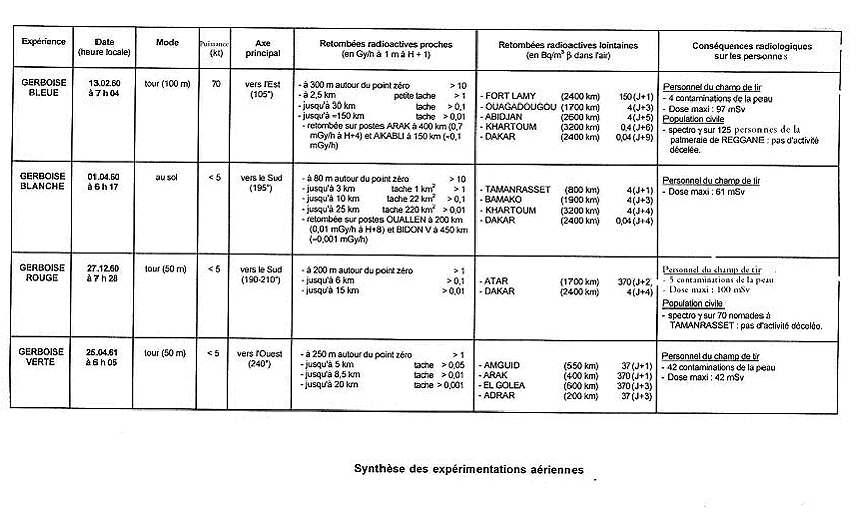
Synthesis of the aerial nuclear tests at the CSEM

=== Fallout ===
Initial monitoring reported a radiation dose of 100 rad/h at 3 km from ground zero one hour after the blast, and 0.3 rad/h at 45 km. Monitoring at Khartoum, around 3,400 km from Reggane, reported 10^{−10} Ci/m^{3}.

In 2005, the Algerian government asked for a study to assess the radioactivity of former nuclear testing sites. The International Atomic Energy Agency published the report suggesting that Gerboise Blanche explosion site had the highest Caesium-137 surface levels of the four tests, with a residual surface activity between 0.02 and 3.0 MBq/m^{2} over a surface area of about 1 km^{2}. The same report showed that while the fallout of the 3 other tests of the Reggane series were contained in circular areas of less than 1 km in diameter, the fallout of Gerboise blanche expanded south-west over a distance of more than 6 km.

== See also ==
- Agate (French first underground A-bomb)
- Canopus (French first atmospheric H-bomb)
- Force de Frappe
- List of states with nuclear weapons
- Nuclear weapons and France
- History of nuclear weapons
