= AN 51 =

- Type: Nuclear weapon
- Place of origin: France

Specifications
- Blast yield: Low: 10 kilotons High: 10 kilotons

The AN 51 was a French tactical nuclear warhead used on the Pluton short range missile; the Pluton system was retired in 1992–93. The warhead was based upon the MR 50 CTC (charge tactique commune - common tactical warhead) warhead, with the same physics package as used in the AN 52 bomb. It had two yields; 10 and 25 kt.
