= Béryl incident =

French nuclear test, #6, in Algerian Sahara in 1962

Béryl
- Location within Algeria

Information
- Country: France
- Test series: In Ekker
- Coordinates: 24°03′46.8″N 5°02′30.8″E
- Date: 1 May 1962
- Test type: Underground
- Device type: A-bomb
- Yield: 30 or 40 kt

Test chronology

The "Béryl incident" was a French nuclear test, conducted on 1 May 1962, during which nine soldiers of the 621st Groupe d'Armes Spéciales unit were heavily contaminated by radioactivity. The test took place at In Eker, Algeria, then a French department, and was designed as an underground shaft test.

Due to improper sealing of the shaft, radioactive rock and dust were released into the atmosphere. The soldiers were exposed to as much as 600 mSv. As many as 100 additional personnel were exposed to lower levels of radiation, estimated at 50 mSv, when the radioactive cloud produced by the blast passed over the command post, due to an unexpected change in wind direction. Among those exposed were several French government officials, including French Defence Minister Pierre Messmer and Gaston Palewski, Minister of Scientific Research.

A number of people from a local village were also exposed to radiation.

== Location ==
The site chosen for the test was In Eker (Algerian Sahara), around 150 km north of Tamanrasset. The Taourirt Tan Afella mountain, one of the granite Hoggar Mountains (south of Algeria), after having been the object of geotechnical surveys (erroneously shown as a gold or uranium mine), was kept as a test site. The site was laid out from 1961 onward (on an airfield built northeast of In Amguel and base camp between the Tuareg village of In Amugel and the well in In Eker of which the border was controlled and occupied by gendarmes). A base called DAM Oasis 1, then Oasis 2, was then built to not be visible from the road a few miles east of Tan Affela.

== Description of the accident ==
=== Failed containment ===
France, having had to abandon aerial tests and replace them with less-polluting underground tests, opted for underground testing in marine (atoll) or desert zones. The Saharan test sites were produced “in galleries”, those having been horizontally excavated in the Tan Afella on the site In Eker.

This type of “shooting gallery” was dug to end in a spiral shape. On the one hand, this shape of tunnel seriously weakened the ground at this point, and on the other hand, it dampened the expulsion of gases, of dust, and of lava produced by the vitrification of the soil. According to calculations by engineers, due to these two factors, the gallery went to the point of collapse and sealing. It was also closed by a concrete plug. Four highly resistant steel doors closed the gallery at different covered levels in order to seal the shaft with polyurethane foam. These measures were used to ensure the greatest possible containment of radioactivity, which justified inviting so many high-ranking officials to attend the test.

=== A radioactive cloud escaping ===
On 1 May 1962, during the second subterranean test, the spiral did not seem to collapse early enough and the plug had been pulverized. The door closing the gallery at the end was projected several tens of metres letting out a cloud of radioactive gas and particles outside the test site. A fraction of the radioactivity was expelled with the gas, lava, and slag. The lava solidified on the floor of the gallery, but the particulates and the gaseous products formed a cloud which culminated at about 2,600 metres (8,500 ft) of altitude, leading to radioactive fallout detectable for a few hundred kilometres downwind from the site.

According to the attending Defence Minister Pierre Messmer, some seconds after the ground trembling caused by the explosion, the spectators saw “a kind of gigantic blowtorch flame that started exactly horizontal in our direction… This gigantic flame was extinguished rather quickly and was followed by the release of a cloud which was ochre-coloured at first, but then quickly turned black.”

Recordings from devices measuring radioactivity were immediately put under military secrecy.

=== Contamination of spectators ===
The radioactive cloud was pushed by the wind to the east, with in this direction, significant atmospheric contamination measured up to around 150 kilometres (93 mi). A certain number of dignitaries, including two ministers (Pierre Messmer, Defence Minister, and Gaston Palewski, Minister of Scientific Research) attended the tests, as well as several military and civilians (one thousand people total).

Pierre Messmer rushed to leave the same evening after decontamination. It would have been more dignified for the chief of the armies to manage the accident. He denied any contamination.

Panicked Atomic Energy Commission personnel washed themselves frantically in an effort to decontaminate themselves. The rush caused by the haste of the participants' decontamination gave rise to little worthy occurrences on the part of some officials after the testimony of Sodeteg (contractor) personnel.

=== Closing of the tunnel ===
Subsequently, the outlet of the tunnel was covered with concrete to confine the radioactive contamination and to delay its dispersion.

== Health consequences ==
Gaston Palewski would die of leukemia at the age of 83, 22 years later, believing, according to Pierre Messmer, that this cancer was caused by the accident. Messmer also died of cancer, but at a very advanced age (91), without being able to link the cancer to this incident. According to official reports available, most military only received external radiation. However, no information is available on the health of the Saharan civilian Tuareg population.

=== Health effects according to official reports ===
Nine people situated in an isolated post crossed the contamination zone after having, at least temporarily, removed their masks. Upon return to their base camp (H6), they became the object of clinical hematological (changes in blood cell populations) and radiological (spectrometry measurement from excreta) monitoring. The committed dosages received by these people had been evaluated at around 600 mSv. Such a dose is not enough to cause acute radiation syndrome, but is above the 100 mSv acute dose threshold for increasing cancer risk. These nine people were then transported to the Percy Military Training Hospital in Clamart for monitoring and additional radiobiological examinations. The monitoring of these nine did not reveal any specific pathology. Trials at Béryl say health consequences are possible for the fifteen heavily contaminated (> 100 mSv) people. Estimates give the following figures:

Number of persons	Dosage
9	> 600 mSv
15	200 - 600 mSv
100	50 - 200 mSv
~240	< 2.5 mSv

The equivalent dosages which would have been received by the population present at the moment of fallout and who would have then stayed in the same spot had been evaluated. The nomadic populations of Kel Tohra, the most exposed (240 people moving about the northern fringe of the fallout) would thus have received a similar cumulative dose up to 2.5 mSv (on the order of magnitude of one year's natural radioactivity).

The number of contaminated in Algeria remains unknown to this day, and the possible contamination of the food chain following the re-flight and/ or local concentration of radionuclides have not been the object of study. The radioactive cloud formed headed due east. In this direction, atmospheric contamination was significant at around 150 km, the distance over which there was no settled Saharan population.

== In film ==
The docudrama Vive la bombe!, directed by Jean-Pierre Sinapi in 2006 and featuring Cyril Descours, Olivier Barthélémy, and Matthieu Boujenah, recounted this event through the experiences of military men irradiated. It was broadcast on Arte on March 16, 2007, then on France 2 on April 28, 2009, and again on Arte on February 10, 2010.

The documentary Gerboise bleue, directed by Djamel Ouahad and released in 2009, widely mentions this incident, in particular with the harrowing testimony from a survivor.

Indirect references to this incident and the related Blue Jerboa test explosions appear in the Netflix fictional comedy produced by Arte called A Very Secret Service (Fr.: Au service de la France) in Season 2.

Documentary At(h)ome from 2013, directed by Élisabeth Leuvray, and Bruno Hadjih for photography and investigation, image by Armani A., Katell Djian, and Zyriab Meghraoui, sound by Mehdi Ahoudig, montage by Bénédicte Mallet, produced by Les Écrans du large.

== In literature ==
The book Les Irradiés de Béryl is the collective account of five authors published by Éditions Thaddée in 2010.

The novel L'affinité des traces by Gérald Tenenbaum discusses the accident through the eyes of a young secretary employed on the base, who then chooses to live with the Tuareg.
