= 1983–85 French nuclear tests =

1983–1985

Information
- Country: France
- Test site: Lagoon, Areas 5–7, Moruroa Atoll; Rim zone, Areas 1–2, Moruroa Atoll
- Period: 1983–1985
- Number of tests: 25
- Test type: underground shaft
- Max. yield: 80 kilotonnes of TNT (330 TJ)

Test series chronology

The France's 1983–1985 nuclear test series was a group of 25 nuclear tests conducted in 1983–1985. These tests followed the 1981–1982 French nuclear tests series and preceded the 1986–1988 French nuclear tests series.

France's 1983–1985 series tests and detonations
Name (Note: The US, France and Great Britain have code-named their test events, while the USSR and China did not, and therefore have only test numbers (with some exceptions – Soviet peaceful explosions were named). Word translations into English in parentheses unless the name is a proper noun. A dash followed by a number indicates a member of a salvo event. The US also sometimes named the individual explosions in such a salvo test, which results in "name1 – 1(with name2)". If test is canceled or aborted, then the row data like date and location discloses the intended plans, where known.)	Date time (UT)	Local time zone (Note: To convert the UT time into standard local, add the number of hours in parentheses to the UT time; for local daylight saving time, add one additional hour. If the result is earlier than 00:00, add 24 hours and subtract 1 from the day; if it is 24:00 or later, subtract 24 hours and add 1 to the day. Historical time zone data obtained from the IANA time zone database.)	Location (Note: Rough place name and a latitude/longitude reference; for rocket-carried tests, the launch location is specified before the detonation location, if known. Some locations are extremely accurate; others (like airdrops and space blasts) may be quite inaccurate. "~" indicates a likely pro-forma rough location, shared with other tests in that same area.)	Elevation + height (Note: Elevation is the ground level at the point directly below the explosion relative to sea level; height is the additional distance added or subtracted by tower, balloon, shaft, tunnel, air drop or other contrivance. For rocket bursts the ground level is "N/A". In some cases it is not clear if the height is absolute or relative to ground, for example, Plumbbob/John. No number or units indicates the value is unknown, while "0" means zero. Sorting on this column is by elevation and height added together.)	Delivery, (Note: Atmospheric, airdrop, balloon, gun, cruise missile, rocket, surface, tower, and barge are all disallowed by the Partial Nuclear Test Ban Treaty. Sealed shaft and tunnel are underground, and remained useful under the PTBT. Intentional cratering tests are borderline; they occurred under the treaty, were sometimes protested, and generally overlooked if the test was declared to be a peaceful use.) Purpose (Note: Include weapons development, weapon effects, safety test, transport safety test, war, science, joint verification and industrial/peaceful, which may be further broken down.)	Device (Note: Designations for test items where known, "?" indicates some uncertainty about the preceding value, nicknames for particular devices in quotes. This category of information is often not officially disclosed.)	Yield (Note: Estimated energy yield in tons, kilotons, and megatons. A ton of TNT equivalent is defined as 4.184 gigajoules (1 gigacalorie).)	Fallout (Note: Radioactive emission to the atmosphere aside from prompt neutrons, where known. The measured species is only iodine-131 if mentioned, otherwise it is all species. No entry means unknown, probably none if underground and "all" if not; otherwise notation for whether measured on the site only or off the site, where known, and the measured amount of radioactivity released.)	References	Notes
Eurytos	19 April 1983 18:53:00.2	TAHT (–10 hrs)	Lagoon, Areas 5–7, Moruroa Atoll: Nerite1 ~ 21.85264°S 138.89405°W	0 +	underground shaft, weapons development		40 kt			
Automédon	25 April 1983 17:32:59	TAHT (–10 hrs)	Rim zone, Areas 1–2, Moruroa Atoll: Therese3 21.87593°S 138.85063°W	5 m (16 ft) +	underground shaft, weapons development		250 t			
Cinyras	25 May 1983 17:31:00.1	TAHT (–10 hrs)	Lagoon, Areas 5–7, Moruroa Atoll: Isurus1 ~ 21.86737°S 138.94077°W	0 +	underground shaft, weapons development		42 kt			
Burisis	18 June 1983 17:31:00	TAHT (–10 hrs)	Rim zone, Areas 1–2, Moruroa Atoll: Zoe3 21.87864°S 138.93836°W	5 m (16 ft) +	underground shaft, weapons development		3 kt			
Oxylos	28 June 1983 17:46:00.2	TAHT (–10 hrs)	Lagoon, Areas 5–7, Moruroa Atoll: Murene1 ~ 21.85315°S 138.90334°W	0 +	underground shaft, weapons development		20 kt			
Battos	20 July 1983 20:30:00	TAHT (–10 hrs)	Rim zone, Areas 1–2, Moruroa Atoll: Pieuvre1 ~ 21.8525°S 138.87541°W	5 m (16 ft) +	underground shaft, weapons development		10 kt			
Carnabon	4 August 1983 17:14:00.2	TAHT (–10 hrs)	Lagoon, Areas 5–7, Moruroa Atoll: Pieuvre2 ~ 21.84785°S 138.87541°W	0 +	underground shaft, weapons development		20 kt			
Linos	3 December 1983 16:58:00	TAHT (–10 hrs)	Rim zone, Areas 1–2, Moruroa Atoll: Zoe4 21.87465°S 138.93913°W	5 m (16 ft) +	underground shaft, weapons development		4 kt			
Gyges	7 December 1983 17:28:00.3	TAHT (–10 hrs)	Lagoon, Areas 5–7, Moruroa Atoll: Labre1 ~ 21.85365°S 138.91277°W	0 +	underground shaft, weapons development		15 kt			
Démophon	8 May 1984 17:26:00	TAHT (–10 hrs)	Rim zone, Areas 1–2, Moruroa Atoll: Ara7 21.88318°S 138.95231°W	5 m (16 ft) +	underground shaft, weapons development		5 kt			
Midas	12 May 1984 17:31:00.0	TAHT (–10 hrs)	Lagoon, Areas 5–7, Moruroa Atoll: janie2 ~ 21.85965°S 138.93121°W	0 +	underground shaft, weapons development		56 kt			
Aristée	12 June 1984 17:16:00	TAHT (–10 hrs)	Rim zone, Areas 1–2, Moruroa Atoll: Dahlia8 21.87603°S 138.85497°W	5 m (16 ft) +	underground shaft, weapons development		5 kt			
Echemos	16 June 1984 17:44:00.0	TAHT (–10 hrs)	Lagoon, Areas 5–7, Moruroa Atoll: Murene3 ~ 21.84419°S 138.90334°W	0 +	underground shaft, weapons development		34 kt			
Machaon	27 October 1984 17:16:00.4	TAHT (–10 hrs)	Rim zone, Areas 1–2, Moruroa Atoll: Fuschia4 21.87394°S 138.93358°W	5 m (16 ft) +	underground shaft, weapons development		5 kt			
Acaste	2 November 1984 20:45:00.1	TAHT (–10 hrs)	Lagoon, Areas 5–7, Moruroa Atoll: Hippocampe1 ~ 21.8702°S 138.95046°W	0 +	underground shaft, weapons development		34 kt			
Milétos	1 December 1984 16:51:00	TAHT (–10 hrs)	Rim zone, Areas 1–2, Moruroa Atoll ~ 21.8346°S 138.8546°W	5 m (16 ft) +	underground shaft, weapons development		500 t			
Memnon	6 December 1984 17:29:00.2	TAHT (–10 hrs)	Lagoon, Areas 5–7, Moruroa Atoll ~ 21.83919°S 138.8546°W	0 +	underground shaft, weapons development		53 kt			
Cercyon	30 April 1985 17:29:00.6	TAHT (–10 hrs)	Rim zone, Areas 1–2, Moruroa Atoll: Yvonne3 21.86854°S 138.92079°W	5 m (16 ft) +	underground shaft, weapons development		13 kt			
Nisos	8 May 1985 20:28:00.2	TAHT (–10 hrs)	Lagoon, Areas 5–7, Moruroa Atoll: Exocet8 21.86923°S 138.97854°W	0 +	underground shaft, weapons development		80 kt			
Talaos	3 June 1985 17:30:00.6	TAHT (–10 hrs)	Rim zone, Areas 1–2, Moruroa Atoll: Zoe1 21.88003°S 138.93971°W	5 m (16 ft) +	underground shaft, weapons development		11 kt			
Erginos	7 June 1985 17:40:00	TAHT (–10 hrs)	Lagoon, Areas 5–7, Moruroa Atoll: Pieuvre1 ~ 21.8°S 138.87541°W	0 +	underground shaft, weapons development		5 kt			
Héro	24 October 1985 17:50:00	TAHT (–10 hrs)	Rim zone, Areas 1–2, Moruroa Atoll: Zoe6 21.87775°S 138.93672°W	5 m (16 ft) – 700 m (2,300 ft)	underground shaft, weapons development	TN-81 ?	2 kt			
Codros	26 October 1985 16:35:00.2	TAHT (–10 hrs)	Lagoon, Areas 5–7, Moruroa Atoll: Nerite15 ~ 21.83957°S 138.89405°W	0 +	underground shaft, weapons development		20 kt			
Zétes	24 November 1985 16:01:00.7	TAHT (–10 hrs)	Rim zone, Areas 1–2, Moruroa Atoll: Simone8 21.86406°S 138.82535°W	5 m (16 ft) +	underground shaft, weapons development		5 kt			
Mégarée	26 November 1985 17:42:00.1	TAHT (–10 hrs)	Lagoon, Areas 5–7, Moruroa Atoll: Janie3 ~ 21.85423°S 138.93121°W	0 +	underground shaft, weapons development	Hadès	54 kt			
