= MR 41 =

The MR 41 is a French-built nuclear warhead to be launched with the M1 and M2 missiles in Redoutable class ballistic missile submarines.

It had a yield of 500 kilotons and was boosted fission warhead based on highly enriched uranium combined with deuterium and tritium.

Entering service in 1972 it was withdrawn from service by the end of 1979, being replaced by TN 60 thermonuclear warheads.

== See also ==
- force de frappe
- FOST
- nuclear tests by France
- Orange Herald
