= 1981–82 French nuclear tests =

1981–1982

Information
- Country: France
- Test site: Lagoon, Areas 5–7, Moruroa Atoll; Rim zone, Areas 1–2, Moruroa Atoll; Zoe and Yvonne Il., Areas 3–4, Moruroa Atoll
- Period: 1981–1982
- Number of tests: 22
- Test type: underground shaft
- Max. yield: 56 kilotonnes of TNT (230 TJ)

Test series chronology

The France's 1981–1982 nuclear test series was a group of 22 nuclear tests conducted in 1981–1982. These tests followed the 1979–1980 French nuclear tests series and preceded the 1983–1985 French nuclear tests series.

France's 1981–1982 series tests and detonations
Name (Note: The US, France and Great Britain have code-named their test events, while the USSR and China did not, and therefore have only test numbers (with some exceptions – Soviet peaceful explosions were named). Word translations into English in parentheses unless the name is a proper noun. A dash followed by a number indicates a member of a salvo event. The US also sometimes named the individual explosions in such a salvo test, which results in "name1 – 1(with name2)". If test is canceled or aborted, then the row data like date and location discloses the intended plans, where known.)	Date time (UT)	Local time zone (Note: To convert the UT time into standard local, add the number of hours in parentheses to the UT time; for local daylight saving time, add one additional hour. If the result is earlier than 00:00, add 24 hours and subtract 1 from the day; if it is 24:00 or later, subtract 24 hours and add 1 to the day. Historical time zone data obtained from the IANA time zone database.)	Location (Note: Rough place name and a latitude/longitude reference; for rocket-carried tests, the launch location is specified before the detonation location, if known. Some locations are extremely accurate; others (like airdrops and space blasts) may be quite inaccurate. "~" indicates a likely pro-forma rough location, shared with other tests in that same area.)	Elevation + height (Note: Elevation is the ground level at the point directly below the explosion relative to sea level; height is the additional distance added or subtracted by tower, balloon, shaft, tunnel, air drop or other contrivance. For rocket bursts the ground level is "N/A". In some cases it is not clear if the height is absolute or relative to ground, for example, Plumbbob/John. No number or units indicates the value is unknown, while "0" means zero. Sorting on this column is by elevation and height added together.)	Delivery, (Note: Atmospheric, airdrop, balloon, gun, cruise missile, rocket, surface, tower, and barge are all disallowed by the Partial Nuclear Test Ban Treaty. Sealed shaft and tunnel are underground, and remained useful under the PTBT. Intentional cratering tests are borderline; they occurred under the treaty, were sometimes protested, and generally overlooked if the test was declared to be a peaceful use.) Purpose (Note: Include weapons development, weapon effects, safety test, transport safety test, war, science, joint verification and industrial/peaceful, which may be further broken down.)	Device (Note: Designations for test items where known, "?" indicates some uncertainty about the preceding value, nicknames for particular devices in quotes. This category of information is often not officially disclosed.)	Yield (Note: Estimated energy yield in tons, kilotons, and megatons. A ton of TNT equivalent is defined as 4.184 gigajoules (1 gigacalorie).)	Fallout (Note: Radioactive emission to the atmosphere aside from prompt neutrons, where known. The measured species is only iodine-131 if mentioned, otherwise it is all species. No entry means unknown, probably none if underground and "all" if not; otherwise notation for whether measured on the site only or off the site, where known, and the measured amount of radioactivity released.)	References	Notes
Brotéas	27 February 1981 23:28:00	TAHT (–10 hrs)	Rim zone, Areas 1–2, Moruroa Atoll: Camelia5 21.80479°S 138.8418°W	5 m (16 ft) +	underground shaft, weapons development		5 kt			
Tyro	6 March 1981 17:27:00	TAHT (–10 hrs)	Rim zone, Areas 1–2, Moruroa Atoll: Dahlia6 21.87616°S 138.85651°W	5 m (16 ft) +	underground shaft, weapons development		2 kt			
Iphiclès	28 March 1981 17:23:00.6	TAHT (–10 hrs)	Rim zone, Areas 1–2, Moruroa Atoll: Simone6 21.86544°S 138.82762°W	5 m (16 ft) +	underground shaft, weapons development		5 kt			
Clymène	10 April 1981 17:57:00.5	TAHT (–10 hrs)	Lagoon, Areas 5–7, Moruroa Atoll: Janie1 ~ 21.82744°S 138.8546°W	0 +	underground shaft, weapons development		8 kt			
Lyncée	8 July 1981 22:23:00.3	TAHT (–10 hrs)	Rim zone, Areas 1–2, Moruroa Atoll: Ara5 21.88363°S 138.95764°W	5 m (16 ft) +	underground shaft, weapons development		20 kt			
Eryx	11 July 1981 17:17:00	TAHT (–10 hrs)	Rim zone, Areas 1–2, Moruroa Atoll: Edith7 21.78692°S 138.86415°W	5 m (16 ft) +	underground shaft, weapons development		5 kt			
Théras	18 July 1981 17:43:00	TAHT (–10 hrs)	Rim zone, Areas 1–2, Moruroa Atoll: Queen4 21.85528°S 138.81564°W	5 m (16 ft) +	underground shaft, weapons development		2 kt			
Agénor	3 August 1981 18:32:58.58	TAHT (–10 hrs)	Zoe and Yvonne Il., Areas 3–4, Moruroa Atoll: Fuschia2 21.87564°S 138.93221°W	5 m (16 ft) +	underground shaft, weapons development		20 kt			
Léto	6 November 1981 17:03:00	TAHT (–10 hrs)	Rim zone, Areas 1–2, Moruroa Atoll: Francoise8 21.79568°S 138.85509°W	5 m (16 ft) +	underground shaft, weapons development		1 kt			
Proclès	11 November 1981 17:07:00.2	TAHT (–10 hrs)	Rim zone, Areas 1–2, Moruroa Atoll: Dahlia5 21.87608°S 138.85822°W	5 m (16 ft) +	underground shaft,		5 kt			
Cilix	5 December 1981 16:58:01.1	TAHT (–10 hrs)	Rim zone, Areas 1–2, Moruroa Atoll: Therese1 21.87608°S 138.85822°W	5 m (16 ft) +	underground shaft,		5 kt			First test located under the lagoon rather than under the rim.
Cadmos	8 December 1981 16:47:00.2	TAHT (–10 hrs)	Lagoon, Areas 5–7, Moruroa Atoll: Requin2 ~ 21.85216°S 138.846°W	0 +	underground shaft,		15 kt			
Aérope	20 February 1982 17:33:00	TAHT (–10 hrs)	Rim zone, Areas 1–2, Moruroa Atoll: Ara6 21.88349°S 138.95549°W	5 m (16 ft) +	underground shaft, weapons development		3 kt			
Déiphobe	24 February 1982 18:15:00	TAHT (–10 hrs)	Rim zone, Areas 1–2, Moruroa Atoll: Queen5 21.85484°S 138.81437°W	5 m (16 ft) +	underground shaft, weapons development		1 kt			
Rhésos	20 March 1982 17:03:00.2	TAHT (–10 hrs)	Lagoon, Areas 5–7, Moruroa Atoll: Krill1 ~ 21.85913°S 138.92235°W	0 +	underground shaft, weapons development		17 kt			
Evenos	23 March 1982 17:07:00	TAHT (–10 hrs)	Rim zone, Areas 1–2, Moruroa Atoll: Therese2 21.87465°S 138.85118°W	5 m (16 ft) +	underground shaft, weapons development		500 t			
Aeson	31 March 1982 16:30:??	TAHT (–10 hrs)	Rim zone, Areas 1–2, Moruroa Atoll: Dora7 21.78462°S 138.87469°W	5 m (16 ft) – 280 m (920 ft)	underground shaft, safety experiment		no yield			
Laodice	27 June 1982 17:00:00	TAHT (–10 hrs)	Rim zone, Areas 1–2, Moruroa Atoll: Fuschia7 21.87033°S 138.92752°W	5 m (16 ft) +	underground shaft, weapons development		2 kt			
Antilokos	1 July 1982 17:02:00.2	TAHT (–10 hrs)	Zoe and Yvonne Il., Areas 3–4, Moruroa Atoll: Viviane3 21.86654°S 138.90449°W	5 m (16 ft) +	underground shaft, weapons development		20 kt			
Pitane	21 July 1982 17:13:00	TAHT (–10 hrs)	Rim zone, Areas 1–2, Moruroa Atoll: Dahlia7 21.87522°S 138.85594°W	5 m (16 ft) +	underground shaft, weapons development		2 kt			
Laios	25 July 1982 18:02:00.0	TAHT (–10 hrs)	Lagoon, Areas 5–7, Moruroa Atoll: Krill2 ~ 21.85526°S 138.92235°W	0 +	underground shaft, weapons development		56 kt			
Procris	27 November 1982 17:02:00	TAHT (–10 hrs)	Rim zone, Areas 1–2, Moruroa Atoll: Edith8 21.78717°S 138.86417°W	5 m (16 ft) +	underground shaft, weapons development		500 t			
