= 1986–88 French nuclear tests =

1986–1988

Information
- Country: France
- Test site: Lagoon Area 2, Fangataufa Atoll; Lagoon, Areas 5–7, Moruroa Atoll; Rim zone, Areas 1–2, Moruroa Atoll
- Period: 1986–1988
- Number of tests: 24
- Test type: underground shaft
- Max. yield: 103 kilotonnes of TNT (430 TJ)

Test series chronology

The 1986–1988 French nuclear tests were a group of 24 nuclear tests conducted between 1986 and 1988. These tests followed the 1983–1985 French nuclear tests series and preceded the 1989–1991 French nuclear tests series.

France's 1986–1988 series tests and detonations
| Name (Note: The US, France and Great Britain have code-named their test events, while the USSR and China did not, and therefore have only test numbers (with some exceptions – Soviet peaceful explosions were named). Word translations into English in parentheses unless the name is a proper noun. A dash followed by a number indicates a member of a salvo event. The US also sometimes named the individual explosions in such a salvo test, which results in "name1 – 1(with name2)". If test is canceled or aborted, then the row data like date and location discloses the intended plans, where known.) | Date time (UT) | Local time zone (Note: To convert the UT time into standard local, add the number of hours in parentheses to the UT time; for local daylight saving time, add one additional hour. If the result is earlier than 00:00, add 24 hours and subtract 1 from the day; if it is 24:00 or later, subtract 24 hours and add 1 to the day. Historical time zone data obtained from the IANA time zone database.) | Location (Note: Rough place name and a latitude/longitude reference; for rocket-carried tests, the launch location is specified before the detonation location, if known. Some locations are extremely accurate; others (like airdrops and space blasts) may be quite inaccurate. "~" indicates a likely pro-forma rough location, shared with other tests in that same area.) | Elevation + height (Note: Elevation is the ground level at the point directly below the explosion relative to sea level; height is the additional distance added or subtracted by tower, balloon, shaft, tunnel, air drop or other contrivance. For rocket bursts the ground level is "N/A". In some cases it is not clear if the height is absolute or relative to ground, for example, Plumbbob/John. No number or units indicates the value is unknown, while "0" means zero. Sorting on this column is by elevation and height added together.) | Delivery, (Note: Atmospheric, airdrop, balloon, gun, cruise missile, rocket, surface, tower, and barge are all disallowed by the Partial Nuclear Test Ban Treaty. Sealed shaft and tunnel are underground, and remained useful under the PTBT. Intentional cratering tests are borderline; they occurred under the treaty, were sometimes protested, and generally overlooked if the test was declared to be a peaceful use.) Purpose (Note: Include weapons development, weapon effects, safety test, transport safety test, war, science, joint verification and industrial/peaceful, which may be further broken down.) | Device (Note: Designations for test items where known, "?" indicates some uncertainty about the preceding value, nicknames for particular devices in quotes. This category of information is often not officially disclosed.) | Yield (Note: Estimated energy yield in tons, kilotons, and megatons. A ton of TNT equivalent is defined as 4.184 gigajoules (1 gigacalorie).) | Fallout (Note: Radioactive emission to the atmosphere aside from prompt neutrons, where known. The measured species is only iodine-131 if mentioned, otherwise it is all species. No entry means unknown, probably none if underground and "all" if not; otherwise notation for whether measured on the site only or off the site, where known, and the measured amount of radioactivity released.) | References | Notes |
|---|---|---|---|---|---|---|---|---|---|---|
| Hyllos | 26 April 1986 17:02:00.7 | TAHT (–10 hrs) | Rim zone, Areas 1–2, Moruroa Atoll: Therese3 21.87593°S 138.85063°W | 5 m (16 ft) + | underground shaft, weapons development | | 5 kt | | | |
| Céto | 6 May 1986 16:58:00 | TAHT (–10 hrs) | Rim zone, Areas 1–2, Moruroa Atoll: Fuschia5 21.872185°S 138.9293°W | 5 m (16 ft) + | underground shaft, weapons development | | 5 kt | | | |
| Sthénélos | 27 May 1986 17:15:00 | TAHT (–10 hrs) | Rim zone, Areas 1–2, Moruroa Atoll: Ursula1 21.87027°S 138.88091°W | 5 m (16 ft) + | underground shaft, weapons development | | 5 kt | | | |
| Galatée | 30 May 1986 17:25:00.1 | TAHT (–10 hrs) | Lagoon, Areas 5–7, Moruroa Atoll: Hippocampe2 ~ 21.86742°S 138.95046°W | 0 + | underground shaft, weapons development | | 30 kt | | | |
| Hésione | 10 November 1986 16:58:00 | TAHT (–10 hrs) | Rim zone, Areas 1–2, Moruroa Atoll: Yvonne4 21.86664°S 138.91395°W | 5 m (16 ft) + | underground shaft, weapons development | | 5 kt | | | |
| Nauplios | 12 November 1986 17:02:00.3 | TAHT (–10 hrs) | Lagoon, Areas 5–7, Moruroa Atoll: Hippocampe3 ~ 21.86427°S 138.95046°W | 0 + | underground shaft, weapons development | | 20 kt | | | |
| Pénéléos | 6 December 1986 17:10:00 | TAHT (–10 hrs) | Rim zone, Areas 1–2, Moruroa Atoll: Fuschia6 21.871°S 138.92852°W | 5 m (16 ft) + | underground shaft, weapons development | | 5 kt | | | |
| Circé | 10 December 1986 17:15:00.2 | TAHT (–10 hrs) | Lagoon, Areas 5–7, Moruroa Atoll: Labre2 ~ 21.84944°S 138.91277°W | 0 + | underground shaft, weapons development | | 32 kt | | | |
| Jocaste | 5 May 1987 16:58:01.3 | TAHT (–10 hrs) | Lagoon, Areas 5–7, Moruroa Atoll: Requin4 ~ 21.84369°S 138.846°W | 0 + | underground shaft, weapons development | | 5 kt | | | |
| Lycomède | 20 May 1987 17:05:00.1 | TAHT (–10 hrs) | Lagoon, Areas 5–7, Moruroa Atoll: Isurus2 ~ 21.86193°S 138.94008°W | 0 + | underground shaft, weapons development | | 30 kt | | | |
| Dircé | 6 June 1987 18:00:00.7 | TAHT (–10 hrs) | Lagoon, Areas 5–7, Moruroa Atoll: Pieurve3 ~ 21.8389°S 138.87541°W | 0 + | underground shaft, weapons development | | 5 kt | | | |
| Iphpitos | 21 June 1987 17:55:00.1 | TAHT (–10 hrs) | Lagoon, Areas 5–7, Moruroa Atoll: Krill5 ~ 21.84702°S 138.92235°W | 0 + | underground shaft, weapons development | | 20 kt | | | |
| Hélénos | 23 October 1987 16:50:00.3 | TAHT (–10 hrs) | Lagoon, Areas 5–7, Moruroa Atoll: Krill6 ~ 21.84338°S 138.92235°W | 0 + | underground shaft, weapons development | | 51 kt | | | |
| Pasiphaé | 5 November 1987 17:30:00.4 | TAHT (–10 hrs) | Lagoon, Areas 5–7, Moruroa Atoll: Murene2 ~ 21.84917°S 138.90334°W | 0 + | underground shaft, weapons development | | 18 kt | | | |
| Pelée | 19 November 1987 16:31:00.2 | TAHT (–10 hrs) | Lagoon, Areas 5–7, Moruroa Atoll: Hippocampe4 ~ 21.86158°S 138.95046°W | 0 + | underground shaft, weapons development | | 62 kt | | | |
| Danaé | 29 November 1987 17:59:00 | TAHT (–10 hrs) | Lagoon, Areas 5–7, Moruroa Atoll: Requin6 ~ 21.8°S 138.9°W | 0 + | underground shaft, weapons development | | 5 kt | | | |
| Nelée | 11 May 1988 17:00:00.3 | TAHT (–10 hrs) | Lagoon, Areas 5–7, Moruroa Atoll: Hippocampe5 ~ 21.85854°S 138.95046°W | 0 + | underground shaft, weapons development | | 20 kt | | | |
| Niobé | 25 May 1988 17:01:00.1 | TAHT (–10 hrs) | Lagoon, Areas 5–7, Moruroa Atoll: Flet1 21.86894°S 138.96794°W | 0 + | underground shaft, weapons development | | 80 kt | | | |
| Antigone | 16 June 1988 17:15:00 | TAHT (–10 hrs) | Lagoon, Areas 5–7, Moruroa Atoll: Nerite4 ~ 21.84857°S 138.89405°W | 0 + | underground shaft, weapons development | | 5 kt | | | |
| Dejanire | 23 June 1988 17:31:00.3 | TAHT (–10 hrs) | Lagoon, Areas 5–7, Moruroa Atoll: Krill4 ~ 21.85138°S 138.92235°W | 0 + | underground shaft, weapons development | | 20 kt | | | |
| Acrisios | 25 October 1988 17:00:00 | TAHT (–10 hrs) | Lagoon, Areas 5–7, Moruroa Atoll: Pieuvre4 ~ 21.83464°S 138.87541°W | 0 + | underground shaft, weapons development | | 2 kt | | | |
| Thrasymèdes | 5 November 1988 16:30:00.4 | TAHT (–10 hrs) | Lagoon, Areas 5–7, Moruroa Atoll ~ 21.87436°S 138.97854°W | 0 + | underground shaft, weapons development | | 47 kt | | | |
| Phéres | 23 November 1988 17:01:00.3 | TAHT (–10 hrs) | Lagoon, Areas 5–7, Moruroa Atoll ~ 21.87436°S 138.968°W | 0 + | underground shaft, weapons development | | 45 kt | | | |
| Cycnos | 30 November 1988 17:55:00.0 | TAHT (–10 hrs) | Lagoon Area 2, Fangataufa Atoll 22.233°S 138.74°W | 0 + | underground shaft, weapons development | | 103 kt | | | |
