= 1979–80 French nuclear tests =

1979–1980

Information
- Country: France
- Test site: Rim zone, Areas 1–2, Moruroa Atoll; Zoe and Yvonne Il., Areas 3–4, Moruroa Atoll
- Period: 1979–1980
- Number of tests: 22
- Test type: underground shaft
- Max. yield: 112 kilotonnes of TNT (470 TJ)

Test series chronology

The France's 1979–1980 nuclear test series was a group of 22 nuclear tests conducted in 1979–1980. These tests followed the 1975–1978 French nuclear tests series and preceded the 1981–1982 French nuclear tests series.

France's 1979–1980 series tests and detonations
Name (Note: The US, France and Great Britain have code-named their test events, while the USSR and China did not, and therefore have only test numbers (with some exceptions – Soviet peaceful explosions were named). Word translations into English in parentheses unless the name is a proper noun. A dash followed by a number indicates a member of a salvo event. The US also sometimes named the individual explosions in such a salvo test, which results in "name1 – 1(with name2)". If test is canceled or aborted, then the row data like date and location discloses the intended plans, where known.)	Date time (UT)	Local time zone (Note: To convert the UT time into standard local, add the number of hours in parentheses to the UT time; for local daylight saving time, add one additional hour. If the result is earlier than 00:00, add 24 hours and subtract 1 from the day; if it is 24:00 or later, subtract 24 hours and add 1 to the day. Historical time zone data obtained from the IANA time zone database.)	Location (Note: Rough place name and a latitude/longitude reference; for rocket-carried tests, the launch location is specified before the detonation location, if known. Some locations are extremely accurate; others (like airdrops and space blasts) may be quite inaccurate. "~" indicates a likely pro-forma rough location, shared with other tests in that same area.)	Elevation + height (Note: Elevation is the ground level at the point directly below the explosion relative to sea level; height is the additional distance added or subtracted by tower, balloon, shaft, tunnel, air drop or other contrivance. For rocket bursts the ground level is "N/A". In some cases it is not clear if the height is absolute or relative to ground, for example, Plumbbob/John. No number or units indicates the value is unknown, while "0" means zero. Sorting on this column is by elevation and height added together.)	Delivery, (Note: Atmospheric, airdrop, balloon, gun, cruise missile, rocket, surface, tower, and barge are all disallowed by the Partial Nuclear Test Ban Treaty. Sealed shaft and tunnel are underground, and remained useful under the PTBT. Intentional cratering tests are borderline; they occurred under the treaty, were sometimes protested, and generally overlooked if the test was declared to be a peaceful use.) Purpose (Note: Include weapons development, weapon effects, safety test, transport safety test, war, science, joint verification and industrial/peaceful, which may be further broken down.)	Device (Note: Designations for test items where known, "?" indicates some uncertainty about the preceding value, nicknames for particular devices in quotes. This category of information is often not officially disclosed.)	Yield (Note: Estimated energy yield in tons, kilotons, and megatons. A ton of TNT equivalent is defined as 4.184 gigajoules (1 gigacalorie).)	Fallout (Note: Radioactive emission to the atmosphere aside from prompt neutrons, where known. The measured species is only iodine-131 if mentioned, otherwise it is all species. No entry means unknown, probably none if underground and "all" if not; otherwise notation for whether measured on the site only or off the site, where known, and the measured amount of radioactivity released.)	References	Notes
Penthésilée	1 March 1979 17:24:00	TAHT (–10 hrs)	Rim zone, Areas 1–2, Moruroa Atoll: Simone3 21.87124°S 138.83877°W	5 m (16 ft) +	underground shaft, weapons development		8 kt			
Philoctète	9 March 1979 16:37:00	TAHT (–10 hrs)	Rim zone, Areas 1–2, Moruroa Atoll: Francoise 6 21.79352°S 138.85648°W	5 m (16 ft) +	underground shaft, weapons development		14 kt			
Agapénor	24 March 1979 16:28:00.4	TAHT (–10 hrs)	Rim zone, Areas 1–2, Moruroa Atoll: Dahlia3 21.87552°S 138.86182°W	5 m (16 ft) +	underground shaft, weapons development		8 kt			
Polydore	4 April 1979 18:07:00.5	TAHT (–10 hrs)	Rim zone, Areas 1–2, Moruroa Atoll: Simone2 21.87083°S 138.83756°W	5 m (16 ft) +	underground shaft, weapons development		6 kt			
Pyrrhos	18 June 1979 23:27:00.7	TAHT (–10 hrs)	Rim zone, Areas 1–2, Moruroa Atoll: Queen2 21.8568°S 138.81779°W	5 m (16 ft) +	underground shaft, weapons development		5 kt			
Egisthe	29 June 1979 18:56:00.2	TAHT (–10 hrs)	Zoe and Yvonne Il., Areas 3–4, Moruroa Atoll: Viviane1 21.87025°S 138.9242°W	5 m (16 ft) +	underground shaft, weapons development		28 kt			
Tydée	25 July 1979 17:57:00	TAHT (–10 hrs)	Zoe and Yvonne Il., Areas 3–4, Moruroa Atoll: Ara1 21.88307°S 138.9738°W	5 m (16 ft) +	underground shaft, weapons development		112 kt			100 kt device got hung up in the shaft after descending 400 m (1,300 ft) of a planned 700 m (2,300 ft). It was exploded anyway, blowing a hole in the rim of the atoll. Six people in the Tuamotos were injured when the wall collapsed and started a tsunami.
Palamède	28 July 1979 19:56:00.3	TAHT (–10 hrs)	Rim zone, Areas 1–2, Moruroa Atoll: Camelia3 21.80241°S 138.846°W	5 m (16 ft) +	underground shaft, weapons development		5 kt			
Chrysotémis	19 November 1979 17:53:00	TAHT (–10 hrs)	Rim zone, Areas 1–2, Moruroa Atoll: Edith4 21.78585°S 138.86635°W	5 m (16 ft) +	underground shaft, weapons development		1 kt			
Atrée	22 November 1979 19:14:13	TAHT (–10 hrs)	Rim zone, Areas 1–2, Moruroa Atoll: Simone4 21.86778°S 138.83114°W	5 m (16 ft) +	underground shaft, weapons development		4 kt			
Thyeste	23 February 1980 18:03:00	TAHT (–10 hrs)	Rim zone, Areas 1–2, Moruroa Atoll: Queen3 21.85583°S 138.81671°W	5 m (16 ft) +	underground shaft, weapons development		2 kt			
Adraste	3 March 1980 17:56:00	TAHT (–10 hrs)	Rim zone, Areas 1–2, Moruroa Atoll: Edith5 21.78621°S 138.86537°W	5 m (16 ft) +	underground shaft, weapons development		5 kt			
Thésée	23 March 1980 19:36:58.49	TAHT (–10 hrs)	Zoe and Yvonne Il., Areas 3–4, Moruroa Atoll: Ara2 21.883328°S 138.967522°W	5 m (16 ft) +	underground shaft, weapons development		80 kt			
Boros	1 April 1980 19:31:00.2	TAHT (–10 hrs)	Rim zone, Areas 1–2, Moruroa Atoll: Camelia4 21.80415°S 138.84341°W	5 m (16 ft) +	underground shaft, weapons development		18 kt			
Pélops	4 April 1980 18:33:00.1	TAHT (–10 hrs)	Rim zone, Areas 1–2, Moruroa Atoll: Dahlia4 21.87542°S 138.85891°W	5 m (16 ft) +	underground shaft, weapons development		5 kt			
Euryphyle	16 June 1980 18:26:58.56	TAHT (–10 hrs)	Zoe and Yvonne Il., Areas 3–4, Moruroa Atoll: Fuschia1 21.87608°S 138.93399°W	5 m (16 ft) +	underground shaft, weapons development		26 kt			
Ilus	21 June 1980 17:01:00	TAHT (–10 hrs)	Rim zone, Areas 1–2, Moruroa Atoll: Francoise7 21.79451°S 138.85581°W	5 m (16 ft) +	underground shaft, weapons development		9 kt			
Chrysès	6 July 1980 17:27:00.5	TAHT (–10 hrs)	Rim zone, Areas 1–2, Moruroa Atoll: Simone5 21.86662°S 138.82906°W	5 m (16 ft) +	underground shaft, weapons development		5 kt			
Leda	9 July 1980 18:03:??	TAHT (–10 hrs)	Rim zone, Areas 1–2, Moruroa Atoll: Dora6 21.78208°S 138.87537°W	5 m (16 ft) – 280 m (920 ft)	underground shaft, safety experiment		no yield			
Asios	19 July 1980 23:46:58.51	TAHT (–10 hrs)	Zoe and Yvonne Il., Areas 3–4, Moruroa Atoll: Ara3 21.88346°S 138.96528°W	5 m (16 ft) +	underground shaft, weapons development		80 kt			
Laerte	25 November 1980 17:53:00	TAHT (–10 hrs)	Rim zone, Areas 1–2, Moruroa Atoll: Ara4 21.883544°S 138.95944°W	5 m (16 ft) +	underground shaft, weapons development		2 kt			
Diomède	3 December 1980 17:32:58.48	TAHT (–10 hrs)	Zoe and Yvonne Il., Areas 3–4, Moruroa Atoll: Edith6 21.78697°S 138.86437°W	5 m (16 ft) +	underground shaft, weapons development	TN-70	51 kt			
