= 1989–1991 French nuclear tests =

1989–1991

Information
- Country: France
- Test site: Lagoon Area 2, Fangataufa Atoll; Lagoon, Areas 5–7, Moruroa Atoll; Rim zone, Areas 1–2, Moruroa Atoll
- Period: 1989–1991
- Number of tests: 21
- Test type: Underground shaft
- Max. yield: 118 kilotonnes of TNT (490 TJ)

Test series chronology

The France's 1989–1991 nuclear test series was a group of 21 nuclear tests conducted in 1989–1991. These tests followed the 1986–1988 French nuclear tests series and preceded the 1995–1996 French nuclear tests series.

France's 1989–1991 series tests and detonations
Name (Note: The US, France and Great Britain have code-named their test events, while the USSR and China did not, and therefore have only test numbers (with some exceptions – Soviet peaceful explosions were named). Word translations into English in parentheses unless the name is a proper noun. A dash followed by a number indicates a member of a salvo event. The US also sometimes named the individual explosions in such a salvo test, which results in "name1 – 1(with name2)". If test is canceled or aborted, then the row data like date and location discloses the intended plans, where known.)	Date time (UT)	Local time zone (Note: To convert the UT time into standard local, add the number of hours in parentheses to the UT time; for local daylight saving time, add one additional hour. If the result is earlier than 00:00, add 24 hours and subtract 1 from the day; if it is 24:00 or later, subtract 24 hours and add 1 to the day. Historical time zone data obtained from the IANA time zone database.)	Location (Note: Rough place name and a latitude/longitude reference; for rocket-carried tests, the launch location is specified before the detonation location, if known. Some locations are extremely accurate; others (like airdrops and space blasts) may be quite inaccurate. "~" indicates a likely pro-forma rough location, shared with other tests in that same area.)	Elevation + height (Note: Elevation is the ground level at the point directly below the explosion relative to sea level; height is the additional distance added or subtracted by tower, balloon, shaft, tunnel, air drop or other contrivance. For rocket bursts the ground level is "N/A". In some cases it is not clear if the height is absolute or relative to ground, for example, Plumbbob/John. No number or units indicates the value is unknown, while "0" means zero. Sorting on this column is by elevation and height added together.)	Delivery, (Note: Atmospheric, airdrop, balloon, gun, cruise missile, rocket, surface, tower, and barge are all disallowed by the Partial Nuclear Test Ban Treaty. Sealed shaft and tunnel are underground, and remained useful under the PTBT. Intentional cratering tests are borderline; they occurred under the treaty, were sometimes protested, and generally overlooked if the test was declared to be a peaceful use.) Purpose (Note: Include weapons development, weapon effects, safety test, transport safety test, war, science, joint verification and industrial/peaceful, which may be further broken down.)	Device (Note: Designations for test items where known, "?" indicates some uncertainty about the preceding value, nicknames for particular devices in quotes. This category of information is often not officially disclosed.)	Yield (Note: Estimated energy yield in tons, kilotons, and megatons. A ton of TNT equivalent is defined as 4.184 gigajoules (1 gigacalorie).)	Fallout (Note: Radioactive emission to the atmosphere aside from prompt neutrons, where known. The measured species is only iodine-131 if mentioned, otherwise it is all species. No entry means unknown, probably none if underground and "all" if not; otherwise notation for whether measured on the site only or off the site, where known, and the measured amount of radioactivity released.)	References	Notes
Epéios	11 May 1989 16:45:00.5	TAHT (–10 hrs)	Lagoon, Areas 5–7, Moruroa Atoll: Labre3 ~ 21.84407°S 138.91277°W	0 +	underground shaft, weapons development		16 kt			
Tecmessa	20 May 1989 17:59:00	TAHT (–10 hrs)	Lagoon, Areas 5–7, Moruroa Atoll: Pieuvre5 ~ 21.83047°S 138.87541°W	0 +	underground shaft, weapons development		2 kt			
Nyctée	3 June 1989 17:30:00.2	TAHT (–10 hrs)	Lagoon, Areas 5–7, Moruroa Atoll: janie4 ~ 21.84957°S 138.93121°W	0 +	underground shaft, weapons development		20 kt			
Cyzicos	10 June 1989 17:30:00.1	TAHT (–10 hrs)	Lagoon Area 2, Fangataufa Atoll: Natice1 22.24438°S 138.734205°W	0 +	underground shaft, weapons development		80 kt			
Hypsipyle	24 October 1989 16:30:00.2	TAHT (–10 hrs)	Lagoon, Areas 5–7, Moruroa Atoll: Hippocampe6 ~ 21.85566°S 138.95046°W	0 +	underground shaft, weapons development		24 kt			
Erigone	31 October 1989 16:57:00.3	TAHT (–10 hrs)	Lagoon, Areas 5–7, Moruroa Atoll: Orque1 ~ 21.85242°S 138.88442°W	0 +	underground shaft, weapons development		20 kt			
Tros	20 November 1989 17:29:00.3	TAHT (–10 hrs)	Lagoon, Areas 5–7, Moruroa Atoll: Krill7 ~ 21.83995°S 138.92235°W	0 +	underground shaft, weapons development		20 kt			
Daunus	25 November 1989 18:00:??	TAHT (–10 hrs)	Rim zone, Areas 1–2, Moruroa Atoll: Dora8 21.78462°S 138.87469°W	5 m (16 ft) – 280 m (920 ft)	underground shaft, safety experiment		no yield			
Lycos	27 November 1989 17:00:00.0	TAHT (–10 hrs)	Lagoon Area 2, Fangataufa Atoll: Mitre2 22.23413°S 138.74355°W	0 +	underground shaft, weapons development		87 kt			
Téléphe	2 June 1990 17:29:58.5	TAHT (–10 hrs)	Lagoon, Areas 5–7, Moruroa Atoll: Nerite5 ~ 21.84422°S 138.89405°W	0 +	underground shaft, weapons development		20 kt			
Mégapentes	7 June 1990 17:30:00	TAHT (–10 hrs)	Lagoon, Areas 5–7, Moruroa Atoll: Requin7 ~ 21.83451°S 138.846°W	0 +	underground shaft, weapons development		5 kt			
Cypselos	26 June 1990 17:59:58.2	TAHT (–10 hrs)	Lagoon Area 2, Fangataufa Atoll: Natice2 22.24197°S 138.73426°W	0 +	underground shaft, weapons development		100 kt			
Anticlée	4 July 1990 17:59:58.6	TAHT (–10 hrs)	Lagoon, Areas 5–7, Moruroa Atoll: Labre4 ~ 21.83987°S 138.91277°W	0 +	underground shaft, weapons development		18 kt			
Hyrtacos	14 November 1990 18:11:58.3	TAHT (–10 hrs)	Lagoon Area 2, Fangataufa Atoll: Mitre3 22.23006°S 138.74379°W	0 +	underground shaft, weapons development		118 kt			
Thoas	21 November 1990 16:59:58.1	TAHT (–10 hrs)	Lagoon, Areas 5–7, Moruroa Atoll: Janie5 ~ 21.84548°S 138.93121°W	0 +	underground shaft, weapons development		36 kt			
Mélanippe	7 May 1991 17:00:00	TAHT (–10 hrs)	Lagoon, Areas 5–7, Moruroa Atoll: Requin8 ~ 21.8314°S 138.846°W	0 +	underground shaft, weapons development		1 kt			
Alcinos	18 May 1991 17:14:58.5	TAHT (–10 hrs)	Lagoon, Areas 5–7, Moruroa Atoll: Hippocampe7 ~ 21.85313°S 138.95046°W	0 +	underground shaft, weapons development		20 kt			
Périclyménos	29 May 1991 18:59:58.2	TAHT (–10 hrs)	Lagoon Area 2, Fangataufa Atoll: Porcelaine1 22.24307°S 138.72516°W	0 +	underground shaft, weapons development		106 kt			
Pitthée	14 June 1991 17:59:57.8	TAHT (–10 hrs)	Lagoon, Areas 5–7, Moruroa Atoll: Orque2 ~ 21.84826°S 138.88442°W	0 +	underground shaft, weapons development		28 kt			
Coronis	5 July 1991 18:00:00	TAHT (–10 hrs)	Lagoon, Areas 5–7, Moruroa Atoll: Requin3 ~ 21.8°S 138.9°W	0 +	underground shaft, weapons development		300 t			
Lycurgue	15 July 1991 18:09:58.3	TAHT (–10 hrs)	Lagoon, Areas 5–7, Moruroa Atoll: Isurus3 ~ 21.85655°S 138.94077°W	0 +	underground shaft, weapons development		34 kt			
