= 1975–78 French nuclear tests =

Series of French nuclear tests conducted in the South Pacific

1975–1978

Information
- Country: France
- Test site: Area 1 (southern rim), Fangataufa Atoll; Dindon zone, Moruroa Atoll; Muroroa Atoll, Pacific Test Area (CEP); Rim zone, Areas 1–2, Moruroa Atoll; Zoe and Yvonne Il., Areas 3–4, Moruroa Atoll
- Period: 1975–1978
- Number of tests: 29
- Test type: dry surface, underground shaft
- Max. yield: 64 kilotonnes of TNT (270 TJ)

Test series chronology

The 1975–1978 nuclear test series was a group of 29 nuclear tests conducted by France in 1975–1978. These tests followed the 1971–1974 French nuclear tests series and preceded the 1979–1980 French nuclear tests series.

France's 1975–1978 series tests and detonations
Name (Note: The US, France and Great Britain have code-named their test events, while the USSR and China did not, and therefore have only test numbers (with some exceptions – Soviet peaceful explosions were named). Word translations into English in parentheses unless the name is a proper noun. A dash followed by a number indicates a member of a salvo event. The US also sometimes named the individual explosions in such a salvo test, which results in "name1 – 1(with name2)". If test is canceled or aborted, then the row data like date and location discloses the intended plans, where known.)	Date time (UT)	Local time zone (Note: To convert the UT time into standard local, add the number of hours in parentheses to the UT time; for local daylight saving time, add one additional hour. If the result is earlier than 00:00, add 24 hours and subtract 1 from the day; if it is 24:00 or later, subtract 24 hours and add 1 to the day. Historical time zone data obtained from the IANA time zone database.)	Location (Note: Rough place name and a latitude/longitude reference; for rocket-carried tests, the launch location is specified before the detonation location, if known. Some locations are extremely accurate; others (like airdrops and space blasts) may be quite inaccurate. "~" indicates a likely pro-forma rough location, shared with other tests in that same area.)	Elevation + height (Note: Elevation is the ground level at the point directly below the explosion relative to sea level; height is the additional distance added or subtracted by tower, balloon, shaft, tunnel, air drop or other contrivance. For rocket bursts the ground level is "N/A". In some cases it is not clear if the height is absolute or relative to ground, for example, Plumbbob/John. No number or units indicates the value is unknown, while "0" means zero. Sorting on this column is by elevation and height added together.)	Delivery, (Note: Atmospheric, airdrop, balloon, gun, cruise missile, rocket, surface, tower, and barge are all disallowed by the Partial Nuclear Test Ban Treaty. Sealed shaft and tunnel are underground, and remained useful under the PTBT. Intentional cratering tests are borderline; they occurred under the treaty, were sometimes protested, and generally overlooked if the test was declared to be a peaceful use.) Purpose (Note: Include weapons development, weapon effects, safety test, transport safety test, war, science, joint verification and industrial/peaceful, which may be further broken down.)	Device (Note: Designations for test items where known, "?" indicates some uncertainty about the preceding value, nicknames for particular devices in quotes. This category of information is often not officially disclosed.)	Yield (Note: Estimated energy yield in tons, kilotons, and megatons. A ton of TNT equivalent is defined as 4.184 gigajoules (1 gigacalorie).)	Fallout (Note: Radioactive emission to the atmosphere aside from prompt neutrons, where known. The measured species is only iodine-131 if mentioned, otherwise it is all species. No entry means unknown, probably none if underground and "all" if not; otherwise notation for whether measured on the site only or off the site, where known, and the measured amount of radioactivity released.)	References	Notes
Achille	5 June 1975 18:15:??	TAHT (–10 hrs)	Area 1 (southern rim), Fangataufa Atoll: Terme Sud 22.279064°S 138.759830°W	0 – 623 m (2,044 ft)	underground shaft, weapons development		5 kt			
Hector	26 November 1975 00:48:??	TAHT (–10 hrs)	Area 1 (southern rim), Fangataufa Atoll: Echo 22.260794°S 138.709748°W	0 – 585 m (1,919 ft)	underground shaft, weapons development		5 kt			
Patrocle	3 April 1976 17:07:??	TAHT (–10 hrs)	Rim zone, Areas 1–2, Moruroa Atoll: Francoise1 21.787999°S 138.864542°W	5 m (16 ft) – 600 m (2,000 ft)	underground shaft, weapons development		1 kt			
Ménélas	11 July 1976 00:30:00.5	TAHT (–10 hrs)	Rim zone, Areas 1–2, Moruroa Atoll: Viviane1 21.8662°S 138.90735°W	5 m (16 ft) +	underground shaft, weapons development		12 kt			
Calypso	22 July 1976 19:00:??	TAHT (–10 hrs)	Rim zone, Areas 1–2, Moruroa Atoll: Dora1 21.78035°S 138.8844°W	5 m (16 ft) – 280 m (920 ft)	underground shaft, safety experiment		no yield			
Ulysse A	30 October 1976 22:59:59	TAHT (–10 hrs)	Rim zone, Areas 1–2, Moruroa Atoll: Dahlia1 21.87442°S 138.86477°W	5 m (16 ft) +	underground shaft, weapons development		1 kt			
Astyanax	5 December 1976 23:00:00	TAHT (–10 hrs)	Rim zone, Areas 1–2, Moruroa Atoll: Edith1 21.783896°S 138.86997°W	5 m (16 ft) +	underground shaft, weapons development		1 kt			
Ulysse B	19 February 1977 23:30:00.4	TAHT (–10 hrs)	Rim zone, Areas 1–2, Moruroa Atoll: Dahlia1 21.87442°S 138.86477°W	5 m (16 ft) +	underground shaft, weapons development		5 kt			
Nestor	19 March 1977 23:00:59.9	TAHT (–10 hrs)	Zoe and Yvonne Il., Areas 3–4, Moruroa Atoll: Zoe1 21.88009°S 138.94102°W	5 m (16 ft) +	underground shaft, weapons development		47 kt			
Oedipe	2 April 1977 23:30:00	TAHT (–10 hrs)	Rim zone, Areas 1–2, Moruroa Atoll: Edith2 21.78424°S 138.86878°W	5 m (16 ft) +	underground shaft, weapons development		1 kt			
Andromaque	28 June 1977 18:15:??	TAHT (–10 hrs)	Rim zone, Areas 1–2, Moruroa Atoll: Dora3 21.78093°S 138.88097°W	5 m (16 ft) – 280 m (920 ft)	underground shaft, safety experiment		no yield			
Ajax	6 July 1977 22:59:58.52	TAHT (–10 hrs)	Rim zone, Areas 1–2, Moruroa Atoll: Francoise2 21.79001°S 138.86049°W	5 m (16 ft) +	underground shaft, weapons development		20 kt			
Clytemnestre	12 July 1977 23:00:??	TAHT (–10 hrs)	Rim zone, Areas 1–2, Moruroa Atoll: Dora2 21.78068°S 138.88239°W	5 m (16 ft) – 280 m (920 ft)	underground shaft, safety experiment		no yield			
Oreste	12 November 1977 01:30:00	TAHT (–10 hrs)	Rim zone, Areas 1–2, Moruroa Atoll: Francoise2 21.79041°S 138.85999°W	5 m (16 ft) +	underground shaft, weapons development		5 kt			
Enee	24 November 1977 16:59:59.9	TAHT (–10 hrs)	Zoe and Yvonne Il., Areas 3–4, Moruroa Atoll: Zoe2 21.87942°S 138.93915°W	5 m (16 ft) +	underground shaft, weapons development		50 kt			
Laocoon	17 December 1977 22:00:00	TAHT (–10 hrs)	Rim zone, Areas 1–2, Moruroa Atoll: Francois4 21.79177°S 138.85851°W	5 m (16 ft) +	underground shaft, weapons development		5 kt			
Polyphème	27 February 1978 23:00:00	TAHT (–10 hrs)	Rim zone, Areas 1–2, Moruroa Atoll: Dahlia2 21.87528°S 138.86306°W	5 m (16 ft) +	underground shaft, weapons development		1 kt			
Didon	8 March 1978	TAHT (–10 hrs)	Dindon zone, Moruroa Atoll: Cuve Meknes 21.780010°S 138.892539°W	5 m (16 ft) +	dry surface, safety experiment		no yield			Safety Test? Not on most references. Location coincident with Denise Blockhouse.
Pylade	22 March 1978 17:30:00.5	TAHT (–10 hrs)	Rim zone, Areas 1–2, Moruroa Atoll: Carnelia 21.80006°S 138.84901°W	5 m (16 ft) +	underground shaft, weapons development		5 kt			
Hécube	25 March 1978 17:30:00	TAHT (–10 hrs)	Rim zone, Areas 1–2, Moruroa Atoll: Edith3 21.78484°S 138.8679°W	5 m (16 ft) +	underground shaft, weapons development		1 kt			
Xanthos	1 July 1978 17:00:00	TAHT (–10 hrs)	Rim zone, Areas 1–2, Moruroa Atoll: Simone1 21.8687°S 138.8337°W	5 m (16 ft) +	underground shaft, weapons development		1 kt			
Arès	19 July 1978 18:00:00	TAHT (–10 hrs)	Rim zone, Areas 1–2, Moruroa Atoll: Coucou1 21.88399°S 138.99582°W	5 m (16 ft) +	underground shaft, weapons development		5 kt			
Idoménée	26 July 1978 23:00:00	TAHT (–10 hrs)	Rim zone, Areas 1–2, Moruroa Atoll: Francoise5 21.79237°S 138.85747°W	5 m (16 ft) +	underground shaft, weapons development		4 kt			
Schédios	2 November 1978 18:00:00	TAHT (–10 hrs)	Rim zone, Areas 1–2, Moruroa Atoll: Queen1 21.85804°S 138.81897°W	5 m (16 ft) +	underground shaft, weapons development		3 kt			
Aphrodite	14 November 1978 18:00:??	TAHT (–10 hrs)	Rim zone, Areas 1–2, Moruroa Atoll: Dora4 21.78156°S 138.87758°W	5 m (16 ft) – 280 m (920 ft)	underground shaft, safety experiment		no yield			
Priam	30 November 1978 17:31:58.48	TAHT (–10 hrs)	Zoe and Yvonne Il., Areas 3–4, Moruroa Atoll: Coucou 21.88384°S 138.99195°W	5 m (16 ft) +	underground shaft, weapons development		64 kt			
Dolon	7 December 1978	TAHT (–10 hrs)	Muroroa Atoll, Pacific Test Area (CEP): Cuve Meknes 21.780010°S 138.892539°W	5 m (16 ft) +	dry surface, safety experiment		no yield			Safety Test? Not on most references. Location coincident with Denise Blockhouse.
Étéocle	17 December 1978 18:04:00	TAHT (–10 hrs)	Rim zone, Areas 1–2, Moruroa Atoll: Camelia2 21.80107°S 138.84749°W	5 m (16 ft) +	underground shaft, weapons development		5 kt			
Eumée	19 December 1978 16:57:01.5	TAHT (–10 hrs)	Rim zone, Areas 1–2, Moruroa Atoll: Viviane2 21.86642°S 138.90406°W	5 m (16 ft) +	underground shaft, weapons development		12 kt			
