= TN 80 =

TN 80 was deployed between 1985 and 1991 as the warhead of the ASMP air-to-surface missile carried by the Dassault Mirage IVP bomber. The yield was 300 kt, and it was hardened against nuclear defense missiles.
