= Canopus (nuclear test) =

France's largest nuclear test

- Canopus mushroom cloud

- Location within French Polynesia

Information
- Country: France
- Test series: 1966–70 series
- Test site: Fangataufa, French Polynesia
- Coordinates: 22°13′40″S 138°38′38″W
- Date: 24 August 1968; 57 years ago
- Test type: Atmospheric
- Test altitude: 520 m
- Device type: Thermonuclear
- Yield: 2.6 Mt (10878.4 TJ)

Test chronology

Canopus (or Opération Canopus) was the first French two-stage thermonuclear test. It was conducted by the Pacific Carrier Battle Group (nicknamed Alfa Force) on 24 August 1968, at the Pacific Experiments Centre near Fangataufa atoll, French Polynesia. The test made France the fifth country to test a thermonuclear device after the United States, the Soviet Union, the United Kingdom and China. It was the most powerful nuclear device ever detonated by France.

== History ==
In 1966, France was able to use fusion fuel to boost plutonium implosion devices with the Rigel shot. Robert Dautray (real name Ignatz Koushelewitz), a nuclear physicist, was selected by the CEA to lead the development effort to construct a two-stage weapon. France did not have the ability to produce the materials needed for a two-stage thermonuclear device at the time, so 151 tons of heavy water was purchased from Norway and an additional 168 tons from the United States. This heavy water went into nuclear reactors in 1967 to produce tritium needed for the device.

France was to test the new device as part of a 5-shot series conducted at the nuclear testing grounds in French Polynesia. The device weighed three tons and used a lithium deuteride secondary stage with a highly enriched uranium jacket primary.

Fangataufa was selected as the location of the shot due to its isolation in respect to the main base on Mururoa. The device was suspended from a large hydrogen filled balloon. It was detonated at 18:30:00.5 GMT with a 2.6 megaton yield at an altitude of 550 metres (1,800 ft). Nominal yield was 2.6 megatonnes of TNT (11 PJ) . As a result of the successful detonation, France became the 5th thermonuclear nation.

A flotilla codenamed Alfa Force led by French aircraft carrier Clemenceau deployed to the south Pacific during the time of the test. The naval force present around the two atolls massed more than 120,000 tons displacement and represented more than 40% of the tonnage of the entire French navy.

== See also ==
- Gerboise Bleue (French first atmospheric A-bomb)
- Agate (French first underground A-bomb)
- Force de frappe
- Nuclear weapons and France
- List of states with nuclear weapons
- History of nuclear weapons
