= Gerboise Bleue (nuclear test) =

1960 weapons test in Reggane, French Algeria

- Location within Algeria

Information
- Country: France
- Test series: Reggane series
- Test site: Reggane, French Algeria
- Coordinates: 26°18′42″N 00°03′26″W
- Date: 13 February 1960; 66 years ago
- Test type: Atmospheric
- Test altitude: 100 m
- Device type: A-bomb
- Yield: 70 kt (292.88 TJ) (Note: Physician Pierre Billaud reported a yield of 60 kt. See External links.)

Test chronology

Gerboise Bleue (French: [ʒɛʁbwaz blø]; lit. 'Blue Jerboa') was the codename of the first French nuclear test. It was conducted by the Nuclear Experiments Operational Group (GOEN), a unit of the Joint Special Weapons Command on 13 February 1960, at the Saharan Military Experiments Centre near Reggane, French Algeria in the Sahara desert region of the Tanezrouft, during the Algerian War. General Pierre Marie Gallois was instrumental in the endeavour, and earned the nickname of père de la bombe A ("father of the A-bomb").

== Name ==
Gerboise is the French word for jerboa, a desert rodent found in the Sahara. The color blue (Bleue) adjuncted is said to come from the first colour of the French Flag.

== Test ==
=== Explosion ===
On 11 April 1958, French Prime Minister Félix Gaillard ordered a nuclear test in the first quarter of 1960. President Charles de Gaulle reaffirmed the decision after the French Fourth Republic collapsed in the May 1958 crisis.

Initial plans were proposed to detonate a nuclear bomb on French territory in the Argentella mine on the island of Corsica. These plans were abandoned after widespread protests on the island.

On 13 February 1960 at 7:04:00 UTC, the plutonium bomb was detonated on a steel tower 100 m tall. The command post was 16 kilometres away from the blast. In order to study the immediate effects, military equipment was placed at varying distances from the epicenter, while jets flew overhead to take samples of radioactive particles. No journalists were allowed on site; instead, an eyewitness account was given to the French press, saying "the desert was lit up by a vast flash, followed 45 seconds later by an appreciable shock-wave"; an "enormous ball of bluish fire with an orange-red centre" gave way to the typical mushroom cloud.

With Gerboise Bleue, France became the fourth nuclear power, after the United States, the Soviet Union, and the United Kingdom. Prior to this test, there had been no nuclear detonations for 15 months. Gerboise Bleue was by far the largest first test bomb up to that date, larger than the American "Trinity" (20 kt), the Soviet "RDS-1" (22 kt), or the British "Hurricane" (25 kt). The yield was 70 kilotons, bigger than these three bombs put together. In comparison, Fat Man, the Nagasaki bomb, was 22 kilotons, one-third as powerful.

As the atomic yield of a new bomb design cannot be precisely predicted, the French Army planned an explosion between 60 and 70 kt. Gerboise Bleue was a total success, yielding the full designed power. However, because of the bomb's irregularly high yield, some experts believe that the bomb may have been "overfilled with plutonium to assure success".

Only two other A-bombs tested in the Sahara facilities were more powerful: Rubis (<100 kt, 20 October 1963), and Saphir (<150 kt, 25 February 1965). Both were detonated underground at the In Ekker facilities.

According to Lieutenant Colonel Warner D. Farr in a report to the USAF Counterproliferation Center "Progress in nuclear science and technology in France and Israel remained closely linked throughout the early fifties." Furthermore, according to Farr, "There were several Israeli observers at the French nuclear tests and the Israelis had 'unrestricted access to French nuclear test explosion data.'"

=== Fallout ===
Initial monitoring reported a radiation dose of 10 rad/h at 0.8 km from ground zero one hour after the blast, 10 rad/h at 28.5 km and 3 rad/h at 570 km. Monitoring at Fort Lamy (now N'Djamena), around 2,400 km from Reggane, reported 10^{−9} Ci/m^{3}.

For decades, documentation of the Gerboise tests remained heavily classified by the French government. The Ministry of the Armed Forces had maintained that the radioactive effects on humans present at the site would be "weak", and "well below annual doses." However, persons present at the site have since stated that protection gear was extremely minimal at the time of testing. In addition, ex-military officers have come forward with stories of being used as test subjects to study the effects of nuclear radiation on humans. Immediately following the explosion of Gerboise Verte (which yielded <1 kiloton), soldiers were sent within a 1 km radius of the explosion site, where they practiced combat exercises and drove tanks around the area. In total, these subjects were exposed to high levels of radiation for three hours. Following the exercises, the soldiers state that they were given showers as the only means of decontamination.

== Subsequent tests ==
After Gerboise Bleue in February 1960, France conducted until April 1961 three additional atmospheric tests in Reggane facility's Saharan Military Experiments Centre. They were only "emergency devices", with yields deliberately reduced to less than 5 kilotons.

Shortly after the final Gerboise bomb (Gerboise Verte), the French moved their nuclear testing to the mountainous In Ekker region, which housed an underground facility. In 1962, the Algerian War ended with the signing of the Évian Accords. Although the French military agreed to withdraw from Algeria within 12 months, Chapter III of the Évian Accords granted France "the use of a number of military airfields, the terrains, sites and installations necessary to her." It was because of this stipulation that France was able to continue nuclear testing in Algeria until 1966. With the underground tests the sequence designation was changed to jewel names, starting in November 1961 with Agate (<20 kt). On 1 May 1962, during the second test, the Béryl incident occurred, which was declassified many years later.

Five months after the last Gerboise A-bomb, the Soviet Union responded by breaking its atmospheric tests moratorium, settled de facto since late 1958 with the United States and the United Kingdom. The USSR conducted many improvement tests, starting in September 1961 with a series of 136 large H-bombs. The series included the most powerful bomb ever tested, the 50-megaton (50,000 kt) "Tsar Bomba", which was detonated over Novaya Zemlya.

Following the USSR, the United States reactivated its own atmospheric test program with a series of 40 explosions from April 1962 to November 1962. This series included two powerful H-bombs topping 7.45 Mt and 8.3 Mt.

China also launched its own nuclear program, resulting in the A-bomb "596" (22 kt) tested on 16 October 1964, and the H-bomb Test No. 6 (3.3 Mt), tested 17 June 1967.

In 1968, France detonated its first thermonuclear weapon, Canopus (2.6 Mt), at the new facility at Fangataufa, a desert atoll in French Polynesia.

All other French atomic-bomb tests, including Canopus, were carried out in French Polynesia from 1966 to 1996. The last bomb, Xouthos (<120 kt), was detonated on 27 January 1996.

== International reactions ==
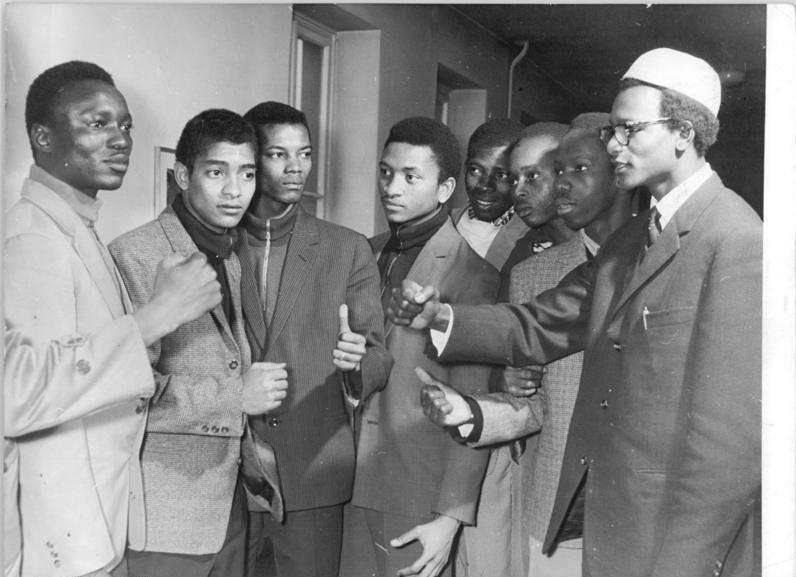
Students from Mali protesting in Leipzig against the French nuclear test

In France, the news of Gerboise Bleue's success was generally met with satisfaction and national pride. President De Gaulle stated:

Hurray for France! Since this morning, she is stronger and prouder.
(Hourra pour la France! Depuis ce matin, elle est plus forte et plus fière.)

However, the nation faced many international critics following the nuclear test, especially from Africa. Just days after the test, all French assets in Ghana were frozen, "until such time as the effects of the present explosion and the future experiments referred to by the French Prime Minister become known." Morocco, which lays claim to the portion of the Sahara where the bomb was detonated, withdrew its ambassador from Paris just two days after the event. Other African nations expressed their disappointment with France's decision to test nuclear weapons in the Sahara, citing fears of radioactive fallout and the safety of their citizens.

== Programme ==
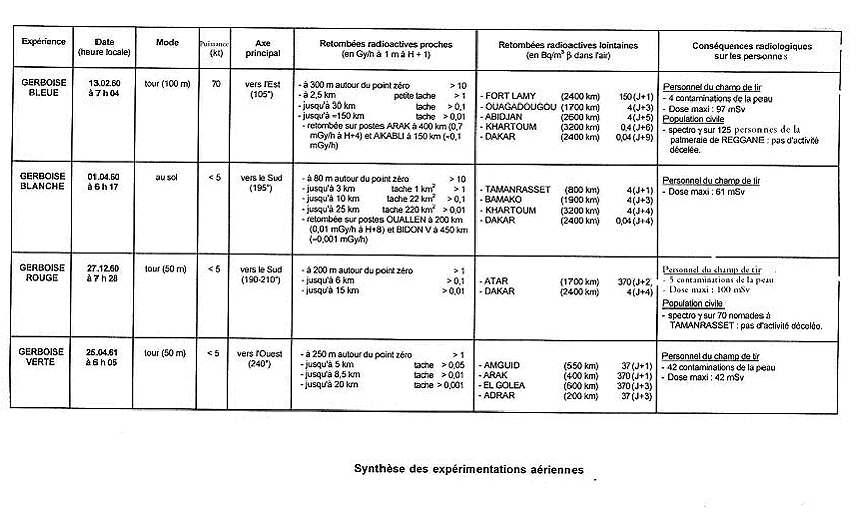
Synthesis of the aerial tests

- 13 February 1960: Gerboise Bleue ("blue jerboa"): 70 kt
- 1 April 1960: Gerboise Blanche ("white jerboa"): <5 kt
- 27 December 1960: Gerboise Rouge ("red jerboa"): <5 kt
- 25 April 1961: Gerboise Verte ("green jerboa"): <1 kt

Gerboise Rouge was followed by a joint exercise, in which infantry, helicopters and armour reconnoitered the contaminated area.

Gerboise Verte was intended to yield between 6 and 18 kilotonnes, but effectively yielded less than 1. Like Gerboise Rouge, it was followed by a joint exercise in the contaminated area, codenamed Garigliano. The test had been patched up hastily and fired prematurely because of the Algiers putsch, as it was feared that the nuclear bomb could fall in the hands of seditious elements. As a result, the bomb yielded less than 1 kiloton, 10 times less than the intended output.

== Later effects ==
After the tests, nuclear fallout was detected as far away as Senegal, Ivory Coast, Burkina Faso, and Sudan.

In 2005, the Algerian government asked for a study to assess the radioactivity of former nuclear testing sites. The International Atomic Energy Agency published the report suggesting that Gerboise Bleue explosion site had the second highest caesium-137 surface levels of the four tests of the series, with a residual surface activity between 0.02 and 2.0 MBq/m^{2} over a surface area of about 1 km^{2} (250 acres). The same report showed that the fallout of the bomb were contained in a circular area of less than 1 km in diameter. It also stated that these levels were not enough to warrant intervention and did not pose a threat to visitors of the area or inhabitants of Reggane.

In 2009, the French government agreed to compensate victims who had been exposed to nuclear radiation as a result of the testing in Algeria and French Polynesia. The government also agreed to release additional documents which detailed how the tests had been carried out.

According to the French NGO ACRO, Saharan dust blown northwards by strong seasonal winds to France in early 2021 carried inoffensive—though measurable—levels of radioactive caesium-137 attributable to the Gerboise tests.

== See also ==
- Agate (French first underground A-bomb)
- Canopus (French first atmospheric H-bomb)
- Force de Frappe
- List of nuclear weapons tests of France
- List of states with nuclear weapons
- Nuclear weapons and France
- History of nuclear weapons
