= In Ekker series, French nuclear tests =

1961–66 tests in Algeria

In Ekker series
- Location within Algeria

Information
- Country: France, Algeria
- Test site: In Ekker, French Algeria, later independent Algeria
- Coordinates: 24°03′25″N 05°03′06″E
- Period: 1961–1966
- Number of tests: 13 + 5 AN-11/21
- Test type: Underground
- Device type: A-bombs
- Max. yield: 127 kt (531.4 TJ)

Test series chronology

In Ekker was a series of 13 underground nuclear tests and five complementary subcritical atmospheric experiments by France between November 1961 and February 1966. The bombs were detonated at the Oasis Military Experiments Centre (Centre d'expérimentation militaire des oasis ) also named CEMO near In Ekker, French Algeria at the Tan Afella in the Hoggar Mountains, by the Nuclear Experiments Operational Group (GOEN), a unit of the Joint Special Weapons Command. At the beginning of the test series, the area was controlled by France as part of French Algeria, which was in the midst of its war of independence. While Algeria won its independence in 1962, the tests were controversially allowed to continue until 1966 as part of the peace treaty.

The series saw the explosion of the first AN-11/21 bombs and was followed by the 1966–1970 series. The tests remain controversial for their continued impact on the region.

== Codenames ==
The 13 underground operations were named after jewel stones, while the 5 AN-11/21 bombs tests were designated as Pollen I, Pollen Rose, Pollen Rouge, Pollen Safran and Pollen Jonquille.

== List of tests ==
Codename (Note: Parenthesis indicate the name given by the APEX (Application Pacifique des EXpérimentations nucléaires), a peaceful use organization.)	Date time (UTC)	Location	Elevation	Altitude	Delivery	Purpose	Device	Yield	Fallout (Note: Original 1960's numbers are in rad/h and were converted to Gy/h, the SI derived unit for ionizing radiation dose.)
Agate	1961-11-07 – 11:29:59.9	Shaft E1 North – CEMO; Tan Afella, In Ekker, French Algeria; 24°03′25″N 05°03′06″E	1,400 m	0 m (Note: Horizontal tunnel of 1,000 m.)	Tunnel	Measurement procedures; Study of mechanical effects	S1	5.0 kt	After 8 hours: 0.040 mGy/h (Drilling T11')
Béryl	1962-05-01 – 10:00:00.5	Shaft E2 – CEMO; Tan Afella, In Ekker, French Algeria; 24°03′47″N 05°02′30″E	1,580 m	0 m	Tunnel	Test of an AN-11 bomb	S2 (Note: Emergency device S3 ready had S2 failed.)	>30.0 kt	After few minutes: (Note: Uncontained explosion) 0.001 to 3.000 Gy/h After 1 hour: 7.000 Gy/h (7.0 km) After 1 day: 0.100 mGy/h (150.0 km)
Émeraude (Georgette)	1963-03-18 – 10:02:00.4	Shaft E3 South – CEMO; Tan Afella, In Ekker, French Algeria; 24°02′29″N 05°03′09″E	1,540 m	0 m	Tunnel			10.0 kt	After 8 hours: 0.400 mGy/h (Drilling T32)
Améthyste	1963-03-30 – 09:59:00.3	Shaft E3 Bis – CEMO; Tan Afella, In Ekker, French Algeria; 24°02′36″N 05°03′24″E	1,220 m	0 m	Tunnel	Reuse of plutonium; Test of new neutron detection devices	P1	0.85 kt	After 20 minutes: 0.200 Gy/h (1.0 km) After 1 day: 0.700 Gy/h (1.0 km)
Rubis	1963-10-20 – 13:00:00.1	Shaft E5 – CEMO; Tan Afella, In Ekker, French Algeria; 24°02′05″N 05°02′12″E	1,510 m	0 m	Tunnel			68.0 kt	After 1 hour: 1.000 Gy/h (1.0 km) After 5 hours: 0.100 mGy/h (? km) After 14 hours: 0.002 mGy/h (150.0 km)
Opale (Michèle)	1964-02-14 – 11:00:00.3	Shaft E1 South – CEMO; Tan Afella, In Ekker, French Algeria; 24°03′13″N 05°03′07″E	1,380 m	0 m	Tunnel			3.7 kt	After 6 hours: 0.050 mGy/h (Drilling T12)
Pollen I	1964-05-08 – ??:??:??.?	Shooting range – CEMO; Tan Ataram, In Ekker, French Algeria; 23°55′57″N 04°44′26″E	940 m	0 m	Surface	*Assessment of plutonium contamination during a simulated accident	AN-11	N/A	
Topaze	1964-06-15 – 13:40:00.4	Shaft E6-1 – CEMO; Tan Afella, In Ekker, French Algeria; 24°03′59″N 05°02′03″E	1,410 m	0 m	Tunnel	*Test of a new plutonium prototype	A1	>1.0 kt	After 6 hours: 0.050 mGy/h (Drilling T12)
Turquoise	1964-11-28 – 10:30:00.0	Shaft E4 – CEMO; Tan Afella, In Ekker, French Algeria; 24°02′30″N 05°02′29″E	1,760 m	0 m	Tunnel	Fusion of lithium deuterium with plutonium; Evacuation exercises (Note: Operations Diaspora, Lapin Bleu, Lapin Blanc, Lapin Rouge and Tortue.)	H2	5 kt	None
Pollen Rose	1964-12-31 – 06:28:??.?	Shooting range – CEMO; Tan Ataram, In Ekker, French Algeria; 23°55′57″N 04°44′26″E	940 m	+1 m	Tower	*Assessment of plutonium contamination during a simulated accident	AN-11	N/A	Contaminated area of 0.550 km^{2}
Saphir (Monique)	1965-02-27 – 11:30:00.0	Shaft E7 – CEMO; Tan Afella, In Ekker, French Algeria; 24°03′31″N 05°01′52″E	1,830 m	0 m	Tunnel		B1	117 kt	Leak of noble gases (Drilling T71)
Jade	1965-05-30 – 11:00:00.0	Shaft E1-3 – CEMO; Tan Afella, In Ekker, French Algeria; 24°03′18″N 05°03′02″E	1,460 m	0 m	Tunnel	*Axial prototype	A2	0.6 kt	After 2 hours: 0.010 Gy/h (Drilling T31) After 4 hours: 0.020 Gy/h (Entrance) After 2 weeks: E1 explosion, leak of noble gases
Corindon	1965-10-01 – 10:00:00.0	Shaft E6-1 – CEMO; Tan Afella, In Ekker, French Algeria; 24°03′53″N 05°02′02″E	1,500 m	0 m	Tunnel	Non spherical device; Study of thermonuclear devices' ignition conditions	A3	>4 kt	After 15 minutes: 3.200 mGy/h (Drilling T62) After 11 hours: 1.8 mGy/h (Entrance)
Pollen Rouge	1965-11-01 – 21:53:??.?	Shooting range – CEMO; Tan Ataram, In Ekker, French Algeria; 23°55′57″N 04°44′26″E	940 m	+15 m	Tower	Assessment of plutonium contamination during a simulated accident	AN-11	N/A	Contaminated area of 2.100 km^{2}
Tourmaline	1965-12-01 – 10:30:00.1	Shaft E3 North – CEMO; Tan Afella, In Ekker, French Algeria; 24°02′37″N 05°02′48″E	1,600 m	0 m	Tunnel	Study of MSBS missiles' ignition conditions; Spherical fission plutonium device boosted with tritium	G3	10 kt	After 1 day: 0.200 mGy/h (Drilling T31)
Pollen Safran	1966-01-10 – 02:06:??.?	Shooting range – CEMO; Tan Ataram, In Ekker, French Algeria; 23°55′57″N 04°44′26″E	940 m	+15 m	Tower	Assessment of plutonium contamination during a simulated accident	AN-21	N/A	Contaminated area of 5.600 km^{2}
Grenat (Carmen)	1966-02-16 – 11:00:00.0	Shaft E4-2 North – CEMO; Tan Afella, In Ekker, French Algeria; 24°02′41″N 05°02′28″E	1,760 m	0 m	Tunnel	Same purposes as Tourmaline, under different conditions	G'3	13 kt	After 2 hours: 0.005 Gy/h (Drilling T42)
Pollen Jonquille	1966-03-09 – 22:12:??.?	Shooting range – CEMO; Tan Ataram, In Ekker, French Algeria; 23°55′57″N 04°44′26″E	940 m	+1 m	Tower	Assessment of plutonium contamination during a simulated accident	AN-21	N/A	Contaminated area of 2.750 km^{2}
References :

== See also ==
- List of nuclear weapons tests of France
- Nuclear weapons and France
- Force de Frappe
- History of nuclear weapons
