= In Eker =

- Village
- Location within Algeria
- Coordinates: 24°1′23″N 5°4′51″E
- Country: Algeria
- Province: Tamanrasset Province
- District: Tamanrasset District
- Commune: In Amguel
- Elevation: 991 m (3,251 ft)
- Time zone: UTC+1 (CET)

In Eker (also written as I-n-Eker or In Ekker) is a village in the commune of In Amguel, in Tamanrasset District, Tamanrasset Province, Algeria. It lies on the N1 national highway 39 kilometres (24 mi) north of In Amguel and 145 kilometres (90 mi) north of Tamanrasset city.

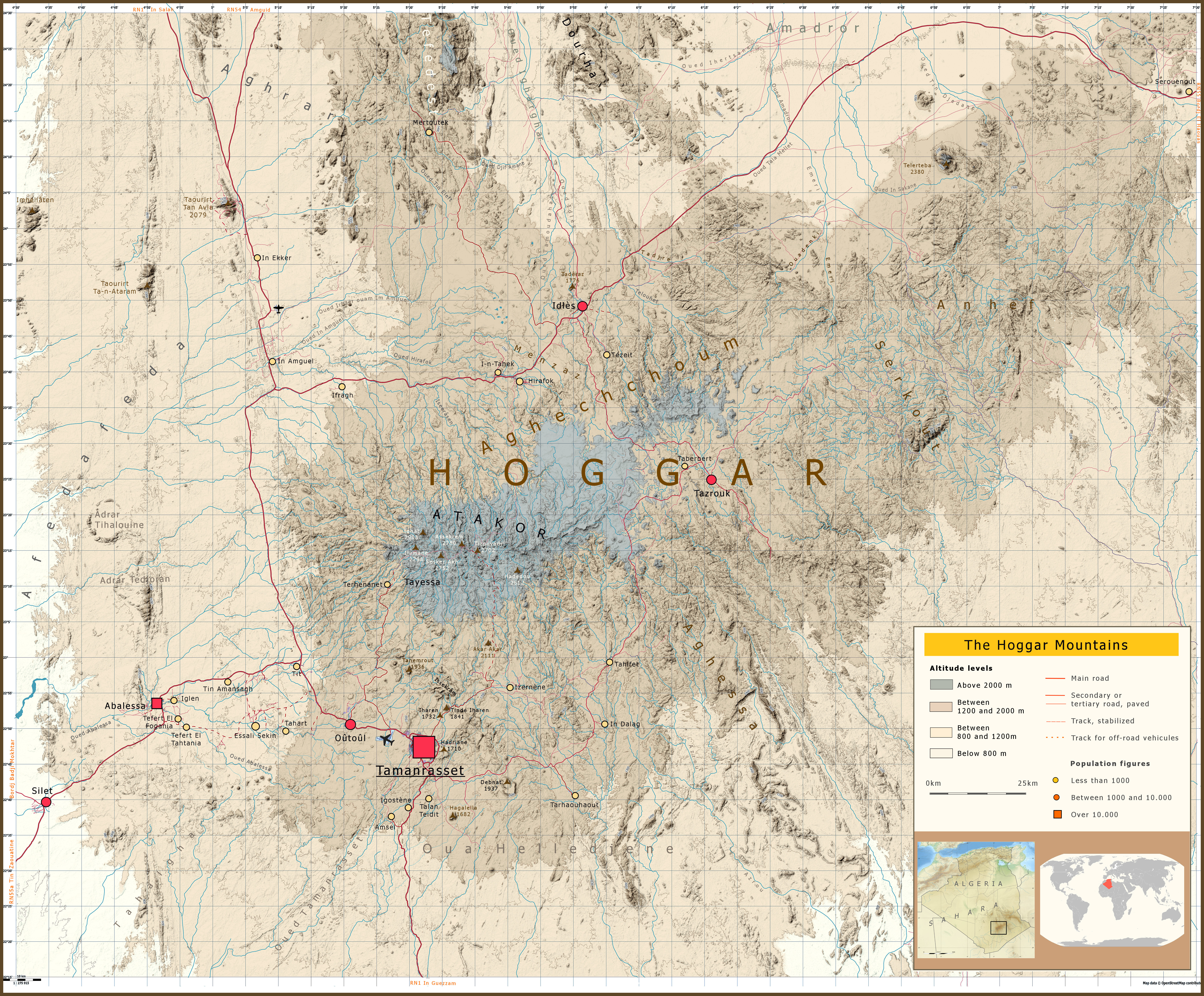
Map of the Hoggar Massif with In Eker west of Idlès

== Climate ==
In Eker has a hot desert climate (Köppen climate classification BWh), with hot summers and mild winters, and very little precipitation throughout the year.

Climate data for In Eker
| Month | Jan | Feb | Mar | Apr | May | Jun | Jul | Aug | Sep | Oct | Nov | Dec | Year |
|---|---|---|---|---|---|---|---|---|---|---|---|---|---|
| Record high °C (°F) | 25 (77) | 28 (82) | 32 (90) | 34 (93) | 36 (97) | 37 (99) | 37 (99) | 37 (99) | 36 (97) | 33 (91) | 29 (84) | 26 (79) | 37 (99) |
| Mean daily maximum °C (°F) | 20 (68) | 22 (72) | 25 (77) | 29 (84) | 32 (90) | 34 (93) | 34 (93) | 33 (91) | 32 (90) | 28 (82) | 25 (77) | 20 (68) | 28 (82) |
| Daily mean °C (°F) | 12 (54) | 14 (57) | 17 (63) | 21 (70) | 25 (77) | 27 (81) | 28 (82) | 27 (81) | 26 (79) | 22 (72) | 18 (64) | 13 (55) | 21 (70) |
| Mean daily minimum °C (°F) | 5 (41) | 7 (45) | 10 (50) | 14 (57) | 18 (64) | 21 (70) | 22 (72) | 21 (70) | 20 (68) | 16 (61) | 11 (52) | 6 (43) | 14 (58) |
| Record low °C (°F) | −1 (30) | −1 (30) | 1 (34) | 6 (43) | 7 (45) | 15 (59) | 17 (63) | 16 (61) | 14 (57) | 9 (48) | 2 (36) | −4 (25) | −4 (25) |
| Average precipitation mm (inches) | 2.5 (0.1) | 0 (0) | 0 (0) | 5.1 (0.2) | 5.1 (0.2) | 10 (0.4) | 2.5 (0.1) | 18 (0.7) | 18 (0.7) | 2.5 (0.1) | 5.1 (0.2) | 5.1 (0.2) | 73.9 (2.9) |
Source: Weatherbase (period of record 10 years)

== Testing site ==
In the 1960s In Eker was the scene of several underground nuclear tests conducted by the French military. They included the now infamous Béryl incident which released a cloud of radioactive dust outside the tunnel entrance, contaminating officials viewing the test.

In 1999 the International Atomic Energy Agency conducted tests at the site and found that some radioactive contamination remained on the surface. This was in the form of several isotopes with Caesium-137 being the most prominent. Their report concluded that nomadic pastoralism through the adjacent areas would result in exposures of around 50μSV/year, however

Persons scavenging metals in the immediate vicinity of the E2 [test] tunnel might receive doses up to 0.5mSv in 8 hours. Currently, external exposure rates are less than one-tenth those existing in 1966.

The study further found alpha particle emission from the solidified lava is roughly the same as the surrounding natural rock, which has some naturally occurring uranium. To date, some limited follow up by French personnel has taken place, but no long-term study of the native population, nor the aquifers in the area has been done.
