= TN 60 =

- Type: Nuclear weapon
- Place of origin: France

Specifications
- Blast yield: 1 megaton

The TN 60 was a French nuclear missile warhead. The 1 megaton TN 60 missile warhead entered service in early 1977 as an interim warhead for the MSBS M20 SLBM. The TN 60 was the first French warhead "hardened" to penetrate the Russian anti-ballistic missile defences around Moscow. The TN 60 was replaced with the TN 61 starting in late 1977.
