= AN-52 bomb =

AN-52
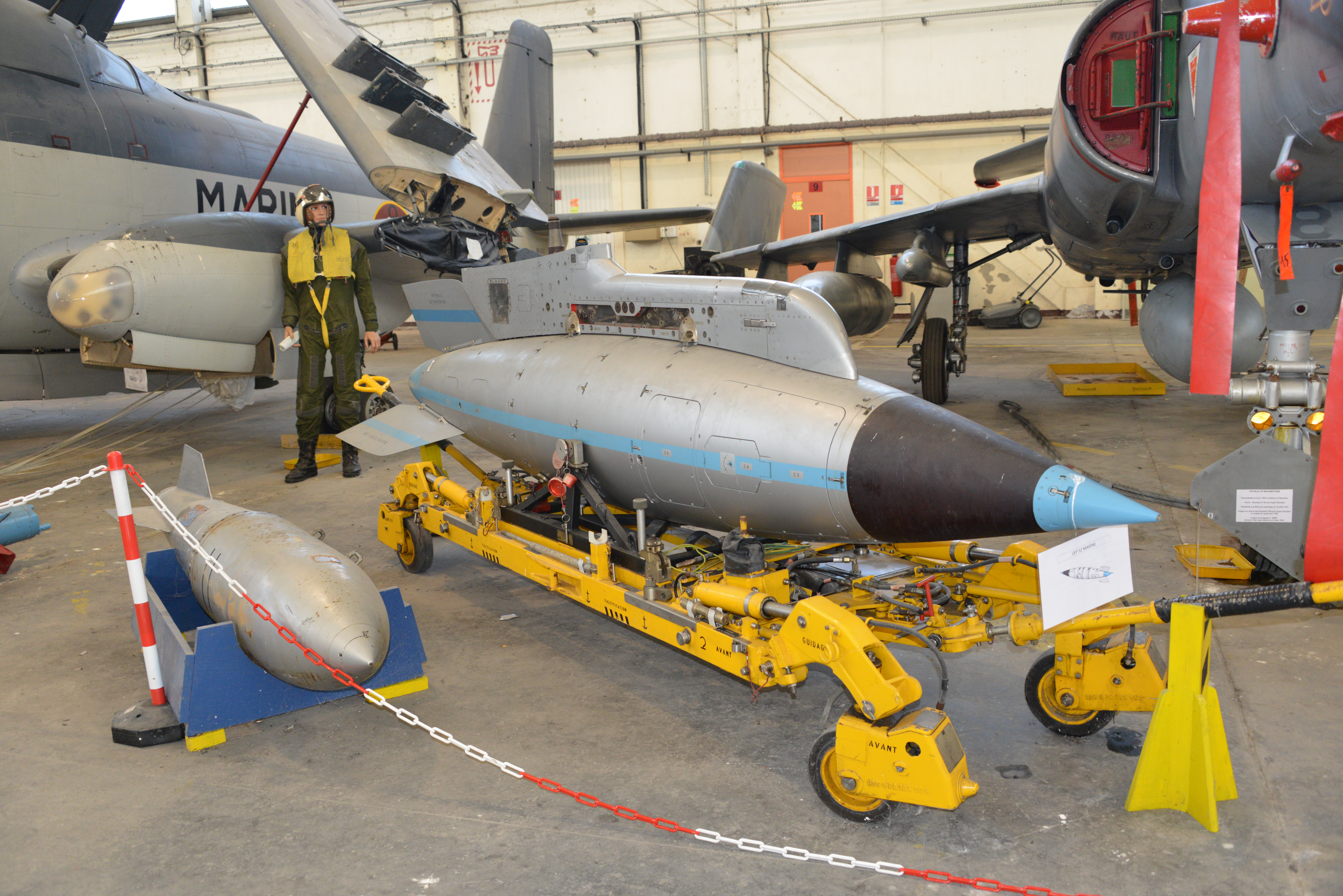
- Type: Nuclear bomb
- Place of origin: France

Service history
- In service: 1972-1992

Production history
- No. built: 80-100

Specifications
- Mass: 455 kg (1,003 lbs)
- Length: 4.2 m (13 ft 9 in)
- Blast yield: Low: 6–8 kilotons High: 25 kilotons

The AN-52 was a French pre-strategic nuclear weapon carried by fighter bomber aircraft.

The weapon was first tested on 28 August 1972, and entered service in October of that year. Between 80 and 100 bombs were manufactured for use by French tactical aircraft.

== Description ==
The AN-52 was 4.2 m (13 ft 9 in) long and weighed 455 kg (1,003 lb). It shared the MR 50 CTC (charge tactique commune - common tactical warhead) warhead of the Pluton missile, with two yield options: a low-yield version with an explosive yield of 6 to 8 kilotons and a higher-yield version with a 25 kt yield.

== Operational use ==
It was carried by Dassault Mirage IIIE, SEPECAT Jaguar A, and Dassault Super Étendard aircraft. It was also temporarily carried by the first 30 Dassault Mirage 2000N-K1 nuclear-strike fighters, pending introduction of the standard Mirage 2000N-K2 version, which was armed with the ASMP nuclear cruise missile.

It was retired in 1992 in favour of the ASMP missile.

== Preserved examples ==
A practice example of the AN 52 is preserved on its trolley in the main hangar at the Musée de l'aéronautique navale, Rochefort, France. Note the AN 52 is not identified as such and has neither labeling or signage.
