= Pierre Auger =

Pierre Auger may refer to:

- Pierre Victor Auger (1899–1993), French physicist
- Pierre Auger (biologist) (born 1953), French bio-mathematician
- Pierre-Michel Auger (born 1963), Canadian politician
