= Energy in France =

Energy mix in France

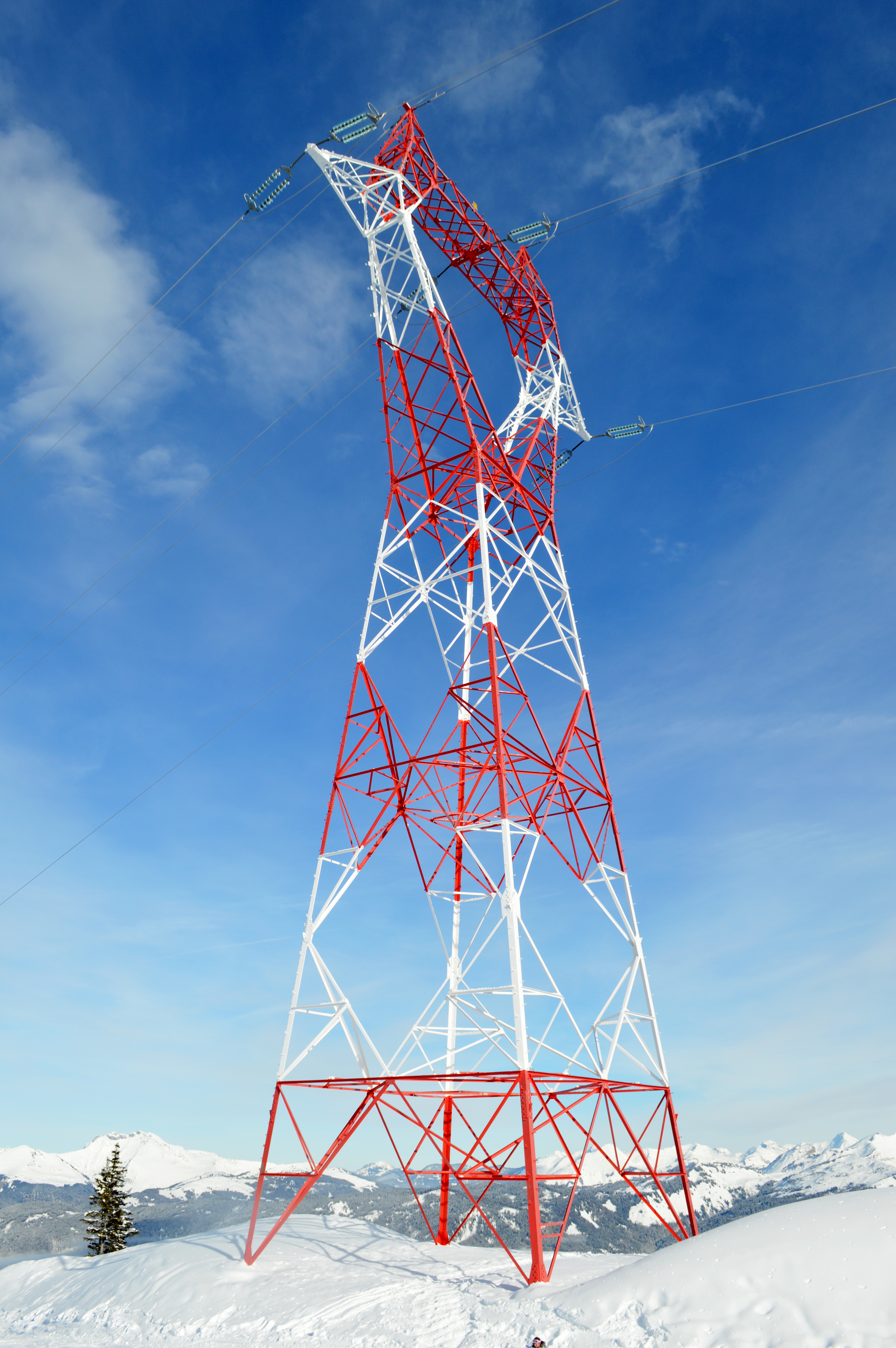
An electricity pylon in Les Carroz, France.

Energy in France was generated from five primary sources: nuclear power, natural gas, liquid fuels, renewables and coal. In 2025, mainland France generated 547.5 TWh of electricity, of which 95.2% came from low-carbon sources. Nuclear generation reached 373 TWh, while renewable sources accounted for 27% of electricity generation. Fossil-fired generation fell to its lowest level in almost 75 years.According to the International Energy Agency, France has historically generated a very low level of carbon dioxide emissions compared to other G7 economies due to its reliance on nuclear energy. The country is also among the world's biggest net exporters of electricity.

In its 2021 Country report on France, the International Energy Agency warned that the country is recording delays in terms of meetings its own energy and climate goals. The IEA pointed to the rising level of carbon emissions due to the reliance on fossil fuels in transport in particular and to concerns related to the aging nuclear fleet.

== Statistics ==
2020 energy statistics

Production capacities for electricity (billion kWh)
Type	Amount
Nuclear	830.53
Hydro	142.07
Fossil fuel	97.14
Wind power	88.64
Solar	30.36
Biomass	24.28
Tidal	2.43
Total	1,215.45

Electricity (billion kWh)
Category	Amount
Consumption	472.70
Production	553.71
Import	19.61
Export	64.43

Natural Gas (billion m^{3})
Consumption	38.19
Production	0.01
Import	46.11
Export	9.10

Crude Oil (barrels per day)
Consumption	1,690,000
Production	81,500
Import	161,600
Export	1,060,000

CO_{2} emissions:
267.15 million tons

== Electricity ==
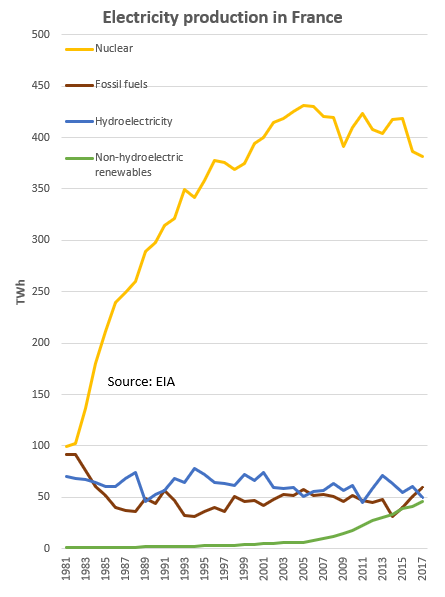

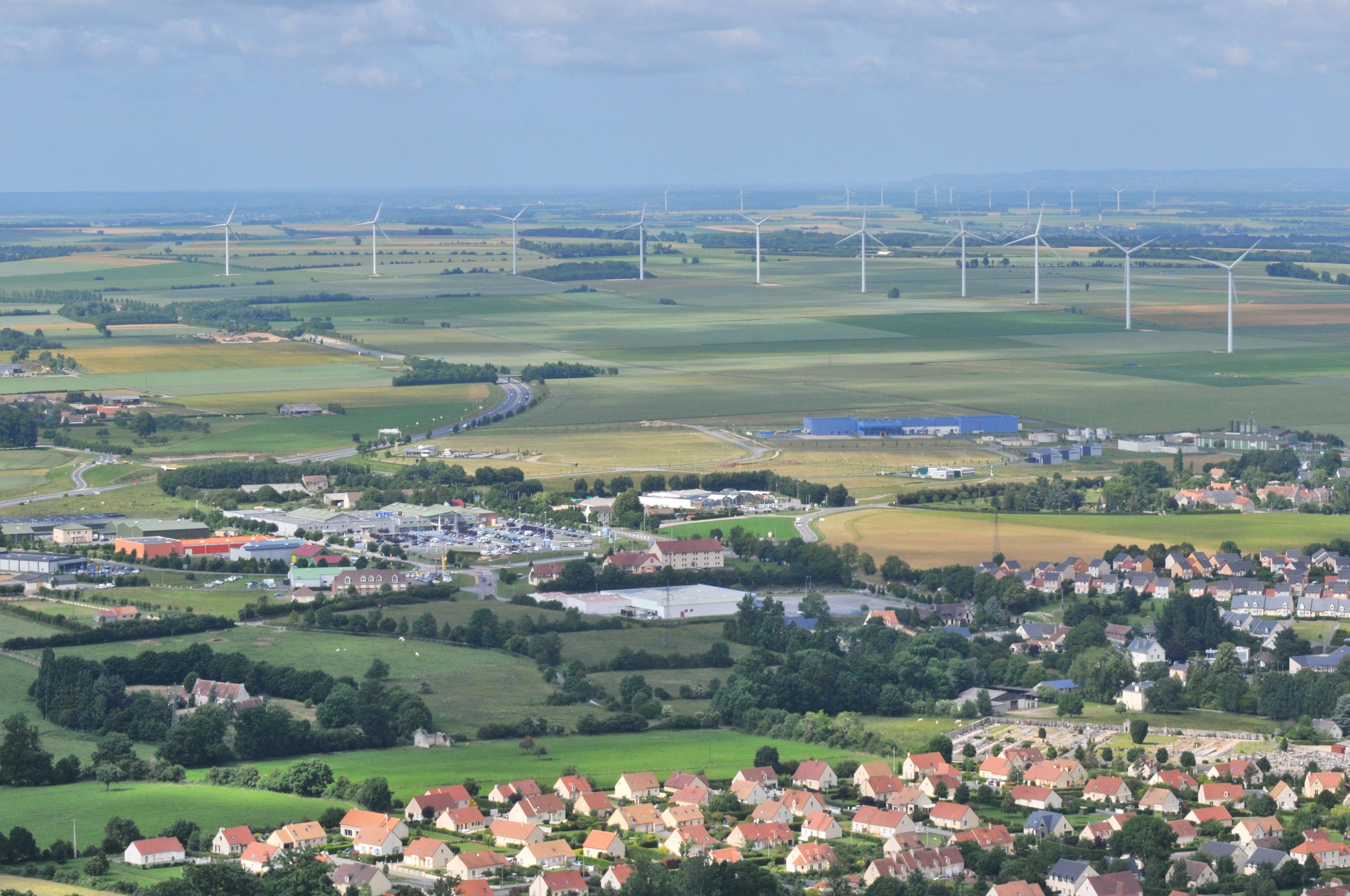
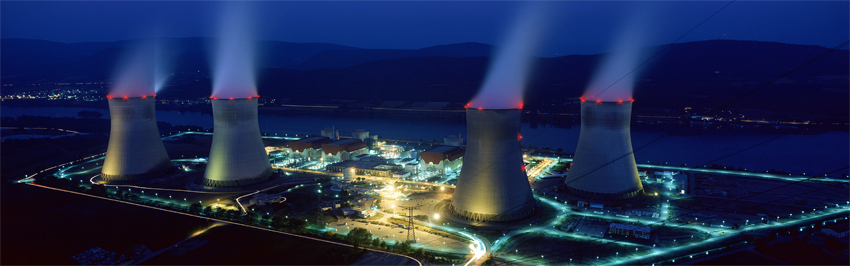
- Left: The Cattenom nuclear power station near Luxembourg
- Right: Wind power in France; wind turbines in Lower Normandy
- Bottom: The Cruas nuclear power plant at night

The electricity sector in France is dominated by nuclear power, which accounted for 72.3% of total production in 2016, while renewables and fossil fuels accounted for 17.8% and 8.6%, respectively. France has the largest share of nuclear electricity in the world. The country is also among the world's biggest net exporters of electricity. The French nuclear power sector is almost entirely owned by the French government and the degree of the government subsidy is difficult to ascertain because of a lack of transparency.

In 2010, as part of the progressive liberalisation of the energy market under EU directives, France agreed the Accès régulé à l'électricité nucléaire historique (ARENH) regulations that allowed third party suppliers access up to about a quarter of France's pre-2011 nuclear generation capacity, at a fixed price of €42/MWh from 1 July 2011 until 31 December 2025.

=== Nuclear ===
France uses nuclear to produce around 70% of its electricity needs from 56 active reactors in 2023. A 2014 plan to reduce the nuclear supply was reversed in 2019 and in 2022 plans to build six new reactors were announced.

=== Hydro power ===
France has 20 GW of installed capacity and supplies around 10% of France's electricity needs.

=== Renewable energy ===
Years in which the last three renewable power levels achieved
Achievement	Year	Achievement	Year	Achievement	Year
10%	2010	15%	2018	20%	2022

Renewable energy includes wind, solar, biomass and geothermal energy sources.

In 2009 a target for 2020 was set of 23% of all energy used would be renewable energy, this was not met as only 19.1% was achieved. France was refusing to pay the possible €500 million penalty fine.

With growing installed wind and solar power capacity, on top of preexisting hydroelectric facilities, renewable energy rose to provide 26% of France's national electricity consumption in 2022.

Government policy aims to increase renewable energy use; in 2015, the French parliament passed a comprehensive energy and climate law that includes a mandatory renewable energy target requiring 40% of national electricity production to come from renewable sources by 2030.

==== Solar energy ====
In 2022 around 15.8 GW of solar capacity was in operation, short of the 2023 target of 20 GW.

==== Wind energy ====
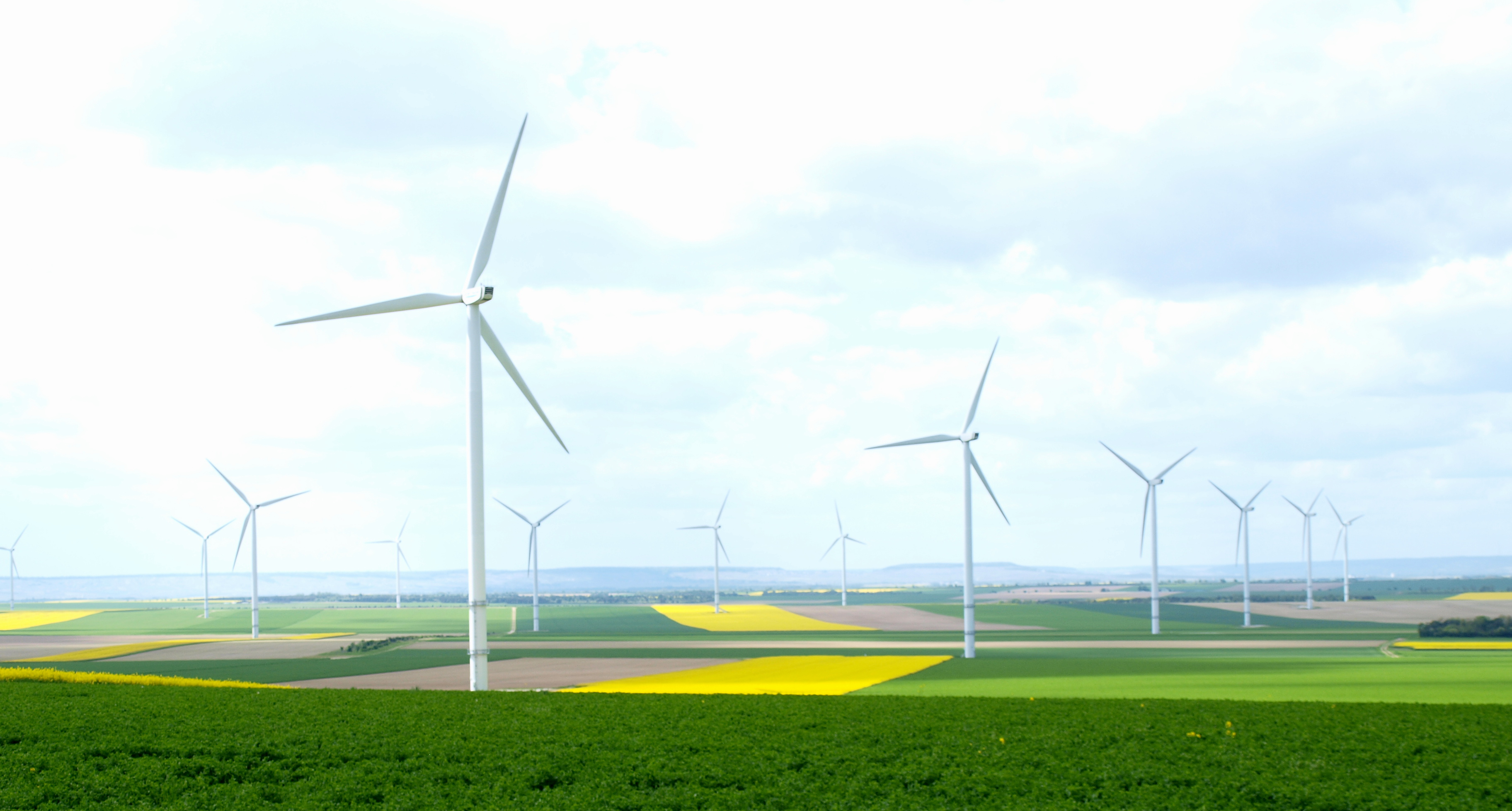
Wind farm in France

An ambitious target of 50 offshore wind farms with a capacity of 40 GW by 2050 has been set by the government, the first farm near St Nazaire came online in 2022, with the fourth offshore wind farm approved in March 2023, a 1 GW farm of 47, 300m tall, turbines off Normandy called Centre Manche 1, scheduled to come online in 2031.

==== Biomass ====
Biomass provides around 2% of electricity capacity.

== Électricité de France ==
Électricité de France (EDF) is the main electricity generation and distribution company in France. It was founded on 8 April 1946 as a result of the nationalisation of a number of electricity producers, transporters and distributors by the Communist Minister of Industrial Production Marcel Paul. Until 19 November 2004 it was a government corporation, but it is now a limited-liability corporation under private law (société anonyme). The French government partially floated shares of the company on the Paris Stock Exchange in November 2005, although it retained almost 85% ownership at the end of 2007.

EDF held a monopoly in the distribution, but not the production, of electricity in France until 1999, when the first European Union directive to harmonize regulation of electricity markets was implemented.

EDF is one of the world's largest producers of electricity. In 2003, it produced 22% of the European Union's electricity, primarily from nuclear power:

- nuclear: 74.5%
- hydro-electric: 16.3%
- thermal: 9.1%
- wind power and other renewable sources: 0.1%

A report was published in 2011 by the World Energy Council in association with Oliver Wyman, entitled Policies for the future: 2011 Assessment of country energy and climate policies, which ranks country performance according to an energy sustainability index. The best performers were Switzerland, Sweden, and France.

== Policy instruments ==
=== Carbon tax ===
Development of carbon dioxide emissions

In 2009, France detailed a carbon tax with a levy on oil, gas, and coal consumption by households and businesses that was supposed to come into effect on 1 January 2010. The tax would affect households and businesses, which would have raised the cost of a litre of unleaded fuel by about four euro cents (25 US cents per gallon). The total estimated income from the carbon tax would have been between €3 and 4.5 billion annually, with 55 percent from households and 45 percent from businesses. The tax would not have applied to electricity, which in France comes mostly from nuclear power.

On 30 December 2009, the bill was blocked by the French Constitutional Council, which said it included too many exceptions. Among those exceptions, certain industries were excluded that would have made the taxes unequal and inefficient. They included exemptions for agriculture, fishing, trucking, and farming. French President Nicolas Sarkozy, although he vowed to "lead the fight to save the human race from global warming", was forced to back down after mass social protests led to strikes. He wanted support from the rest of the European Union before proceeding.

In 2014, a carbon tax was implemented. Prime Minister Jean-Marc Ayrault announced the new Climate Energy Contribution (CEC) on 21 September 2013. The tax would apply at a rate of €7/tonne CO_{2} in 2014, €14.50 in 2015 and rising to €22 in 2016. As of 2018, the carbon tax was at €44.60/tonne. and was due to increase every year to reach €65.40/tonne in 2020 and €86.20/tonne in 2022.

After weeks of protests by the "Gilets Jaunes" (yellow vests) against the rise of gas prices, French President Emmanuel Macron announced on 4 December 2018, the tax would not be increased in 2019 as planned.

=== Petroleum products ===
Petroleum products accounted for 28.1% of energy use in France in 2022, having dropped from 37% in 1990 and 66% in the 1970's.

2022 fuel taxes, in Euro
	Diesel	Gasoline	Natural gas		Coal	Electricity
per unit	litre	litre	m^{3}	MWh	tonne	MWh
Excise	0.59	0.68		8.41		1.00
Environment						

== See also ==
- History of France's civil nuclear program
- History of France's military nuclear program
- Electricity sector in France
- Nuclear power in France
- Renewable energy in France
- Électricité de France (EDF)
