= Bertrand Goldschmidt =

French chemist (1912–2002)

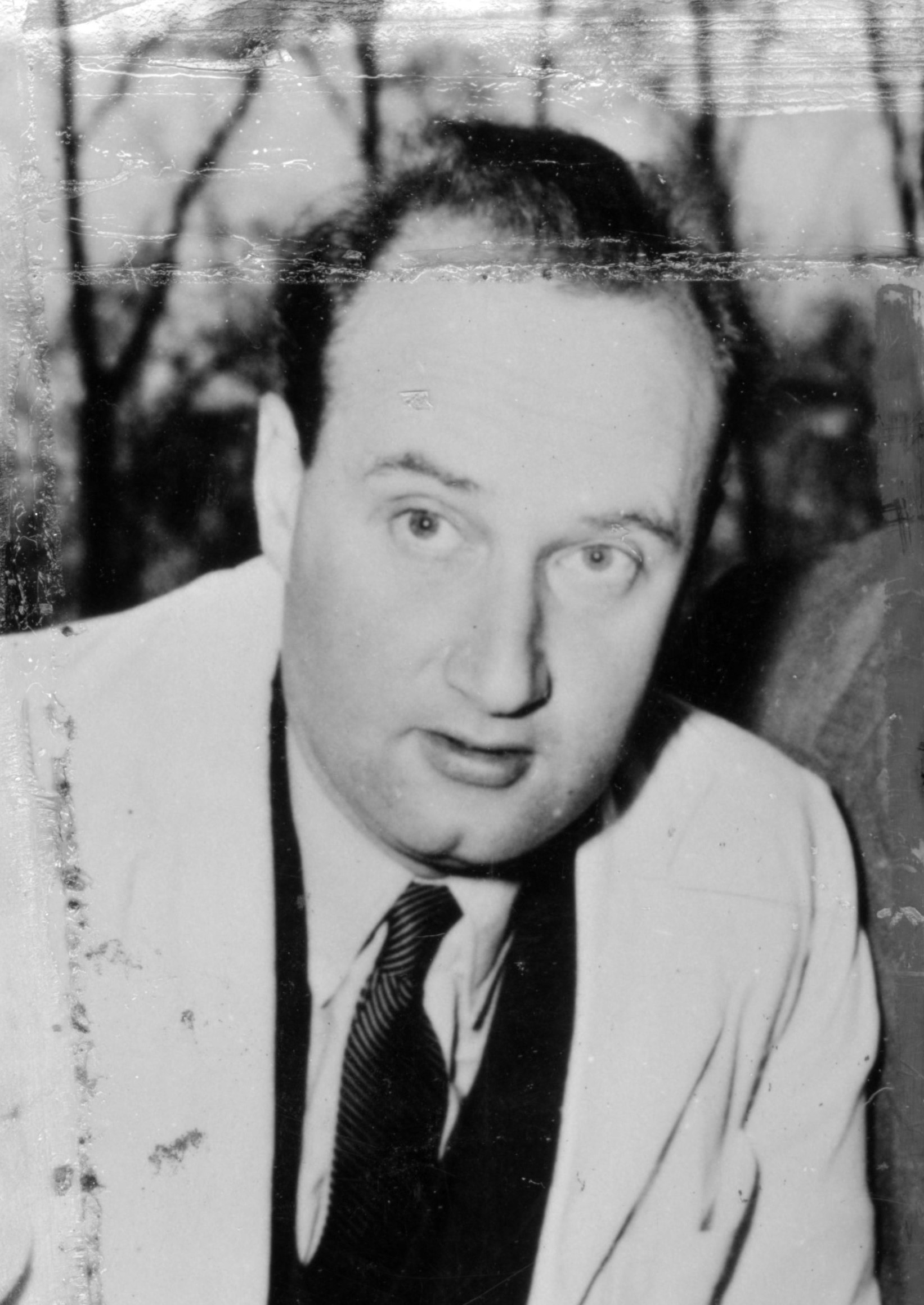
- Goldschmidt in the 1960s
- Born: November 2, 1912; Paris, France
- Died: June 11, 2002 (aged 89); Paris, France
- Education: ESPCI Paris
- Known for: French atomic bomb
- Scientific career
- Fields: Nuclear physics
- Workplaces: French Alternative Energies and Atomic Energy Commission
- Thesis: Etude du fractionnement par cristallisation mixte à l'aide des radioéléments (1939)

Bertrand Goldschmidt (2 November 1912 – 11 June 2002) was a French chemist. He is considered one of the fathers of the French atomic bomb, which was tested for the first time in 1960 in the nuclear test Gerboise Bleue.

== Biography ==
Bertrand Goldschmidt was born in Paris on 2 November 1912 to a French mother and a Belgian father of Jewish origin. He entered the Paris School of Industrial Physics and Chemistry in 1932 and was recruited to the Radium Institute in 1933 by Marie Curie. He obtained his doctorate in 1939.

During the Battle of France, Goldschmidt served in a military laboratory in Poitiers and was taken prisoner by the invading Germans. They later released him and he moved into the unoccupied zone. He taught for a short time in Montpellier, until the post-surrender Vichy government changed the status of Jews under pressure from the Germans. He then emigrated to the United States and arrived in New York City in May 1941, where he joined the Free French Forces.

Enrico Fermi later asked Goldschmidt to join him at Columbia University as one of the group of scientists working on the project which would later initiate the world's first man-made self-sustaining nuclear chain reaction in the Chicago Pile-1 experimental reactor. Despite the decision of the U.S. government to refuse the participation of French scientists, Goldschmidt was permitted to join the group in July 1942. He would be the only French citizen to participate in the Manhattan Project on U.S. soil. He worked in the group of Glenn Seaborg, on the development of the PUREX process for separation of plutonium and uranium and was involved in the extraction of the first gram of plutonium produced in Chicago Pile-1.

He later joined the Anglo-Canadian nuclear program at the Montreal Laboratory, where he worked with other French scientists such as Hans von Halban, Jules Guéron, Pierre Auger, and Lew Kowarski who would join the project in 1944. They contributed to the development of Canada's first nuclear reactor, the ZEEP, in September 1945. He returned to France in 1946.

Goldschmidt was one of the founders of the French Atomic Energy Commission (CEA) in 1945. In November 1949, he and his collaborators Pierre Regnault, Jean Sauteron, and André Chesne extracted the first few milligrams of plutonium from the spent fuel from the Zoé nuclear reactor at the Bouchet plant in Ballancourt-sur-Essonne, an essential step for the production of the French atomic bomb. He would also play a critical role in the establishment of the Israeli nuclear program. Goldschmidt traveled to Israel in 1954 to meet with David Ben-Gurion about nuclear issues and would serve, between 1956 and 1957, as one of the CEA officials in the negotiations leading to the establishment of the Dimona nuclear facility.

Goldschmidt headed the department of chemistry of the French Atomic Energy Commission until 1960. He is the author of numerous books on the history of the development of nuclear energy. He was the French representative in the Board of Governors of the International Atomic Energy Agency from 1958 to 1980.

He died on 11 June 2002 in Paris.

== See also ==
- Abdul Qadeer Khan
- Deng Jiaxian
- Homi J. Bhabha
- Igor Kurchatov
- J. Robert Oppenheimer
- William Penney, Baron Penney

== Bibliography ==
- Notices d'autorité : Système universitaire de documentation • Bibliothèque nationale de France • Fichier d'autorité international virtuel • Bibliothèque du *Congrès • Gemeinsame Normdatei • WorldCat
- Conclusion sur bikini, Atomes n o 9, December 1946
- La purification de l'uranium, Atomes n o 15, February 1949
- L'aventure atomique, Fayard, 1962
- Le cycle de l'uranium, Atomes n o 85, April 1953 (Spécial Le centre atomique de Saclay)
- Les rivalités atomiques 1939-1966, Fayard, 1967
- Le Complexe atomique : Histoire politique de l'énergie nucléaire, Fayard, 1980
- Les premiers milligrammes de plutonium, La Recherche no 131, March 1982
- Pionniers de l'atome, Stock, 1987
- Goldschmidt, Bertrand (1990). Atomic Rivals. Rutgers University Press. ISBN 0813515181.
- Cohen, Avner. "The Avner Cohen Collection." Bertrand Goldschmidt. Wilson Center, 3 Oct 2013. Web. 5 Nov 2013. Bertrand Goldschmidt | Wilson Center
