= Research Institute for Development, Communication and School Partnership =

The Research Institute for Development, Communication and School Partnership (RIDCSP), is a non-governmental, non-profit, and non-political organisation that was founded in Cameroon in 1999. This organisation obtained authorised status on 14 November 2001 following the government recognition of its activities.

This organisation operates in the rural and urban areas of Cameroon. Its aims are to coordinate the exchange of ideas and opinions between students and teachers of schools, to alleviate poverty, to open libraries in rural and urban areas, to fight against the spread of HIV/AIDS, and to promote sustainable development, human rights especially for women and children, and communication and information technology in Cameroon.

Due to fail to communicate progress, The RIDCSP, was delisted or expelled to United Nations
