= Jules Guéron =

French physical chemist and atomic scientist

- Born: 2 June 1907; Tunis, French Tunisia
- Died: 11 October 1990 (aged 83); Paris, France
- Education: University of Paris-Sorbonne
- Awards: Légion d'honneur
- Scientific career
- Fields: Nuclear physics
- Workplaces: Commissariat à l'énergie atomique European Atomic Energy Community University of Paris-Sud
- Doctoral advisor: Marcel Guichard

Jules Guéron (2 June 1907 – 11 October 1990) was a French physical chemist and atomic scientist who played a key role in the development of atomic energy in France.

== Biography ==
=== Early life ===
Guéron was educated at Lycée Charlemagne in Paris (1913-1924). He graduated with the "baccalauréat" (high school degree) in Latin, Sciences and Mathematics. From 1926 to 1935 he studied at the University of Paris-Sorbonne in Prof. Marcel Guichard's laboratory, earning a doctorate in physical sciences for which he was awarded the Adrian prize of the French Society of Chemistry.

In 1938 Guéron was appointed lecturer at the University of Strasbourg. He married Geneviève Bernheim in 1934 and had three sons (Maurice, Henri and Frédéric).

=== World War II ===
Responding to the historic call for resistance of General Charles de Gaulle, Guéron made his way to Great Britain in June 1940. He enlisted in the Free French Forces and was at first assigned to the Service technique de l'Armement. In December 1941 he was transferred to the Anglo-Canadian Atomic Energy Project, known as "Tube Alloys", at the Cavendish Laboratory in Cambridge.

In 1943 Guéron moved to Montreal as a member of the Tube Alloys team, which at this point also included the French scientists Hans Halban, Pierre Auger, Bertrand Goldschmidt, and Lew Kowarski. Work at Tube Alloys did not always proceed smoothly. Most notable was a lengthy interruption of the collaboration with the (American) Manhattan Project which lasted until the August 1943 Quebec agreement between Winston Churchill and Franklin D. Roosevelt. The French scientists had their own concerns. Some were highly critical of de Gaulle's constant opposition to the United States, and they imagined that he might reconsider if made aware of this specific and significant instance of America's awesome strength. In this spirit, when General de Gaulle visited Ottawa on 11 July 1944, Guéron personally imparted his near certainty that within one year the US would master a highly powerful weapon: "une bombe, une ville."

=== A career in atomic energy ===
In 1945, the French government established the Atomic Energy Commission (CEA) with the charter of exploring atomic energy. Guéron was nominated Head of the Chemistry unit. In 1951 he became the first director of the CEA's nuclear research center in Saclay.

In 1958 Guéron was recruited by the European Atomic Energy Community (Euratom) as General Director of Research and Education (1958–1968).

From 1969 to 1976 Guéron was a professor at the University of Paris-Sud. Concurrently, he consulted for Framatome, the firm responsible for building the vast park of French electricity-producing nuclear reactors.

He also served as Secretary of the International Commission on Atomic Weights (1960–1969). He is the author of several books and of many articles on atomic energy. He was made "Officier de la Légion d'honneur".

== Bibliography ==
- Guéron, Jules (1931). Ozone (in French). Masson.
- Guéron, Jules (1956). The Economics of Nuclear Power. Pergamon Press.
- Guéron, Jules (1973). L'Énergie nucléaire (in French). Presses Universitaires de France.
- Guéron, Jules (1977). Les matériaux nucléaires (in French). Presses Universitaires de France.
