= France and weapons of mass destruction =

French Republic
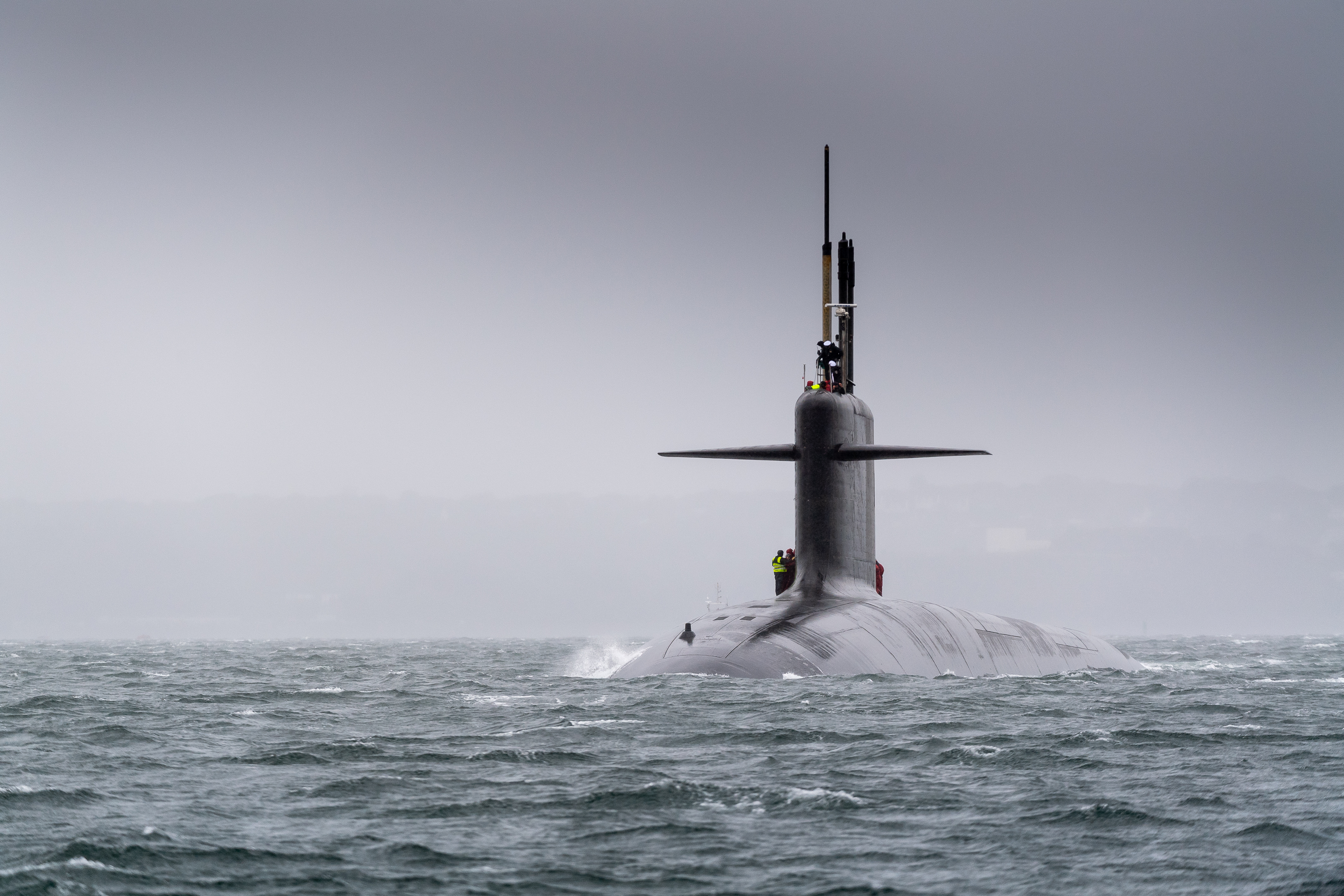
- One of four Triomphant-class submarines that carry nuclear-armed ballistic missiles

- Nuclear program start date: 26 December 1954
- First nuclear weapon test: 13 February 1960
- First thermonuclear weapon test: 24 August 1968
- Last nuclear test: 27 January 1996
- Largest yield test: 2.6 Mt (24 August 1968)
- Total tests: 210
- Peak stockpile: 540 (1992)
- Current stockpile: ~290 warheads (2023)
- Deployed warheads: ~290 warheads (2025)
- Total deployed warhead megatonnage: ~51.6
- Maximum missile range: ~8,000–10,000km/5,000–6,250mi (M51 SLBM)
- Strategic forces: Navy; Triomphant-class submarines; M51 ballistic missiles; Dassault Rafale carrier-based fighters; ASMP-A air-launched cruise missiles; Air and Space Force; Dassault Rafale fighters; ASMP-A air-launched cruise missiles
- NPT party: Yes (1992, one of five recognized nuclear-weapon states)

France is one of the five nuclear-weapon states recognized by the Non-Proliferation Treaty (NPT). As of 2025, the stockpile country's nuclear forces, the Force de dissuasion is estimated at 290 deployed nuclear warheads, making it the fourth-largest confirmed in the world numerically, with delivery primarily by Triomphant-class submarines, and also three cruise missile-armed fighter squadrons. France is not known to possess or develop any chemical or biological weapons. France remains the only NATO member to not participate in its Nuclear Planning Group.

France was the fourth country to test a nuclear weapon, in 1960, and tested its first thermonuclear weapon in 1968. Charles de Gaulle was influential in the country's decision to develop both weapons and nuclear forces. France is also believed to have tested neutron bomb designs. The forces were developed in the late 1950s and 1960s to give France the ability to distance itself from NATO while still deterring the Soviet Union. France was the last of the five NPT-recognized nuclear-weapon states to ratify the treaty, in 1992. The same year, its arsenal peaked at 540 warheads, and was the world's third largest until being overtaken by China in 2020. The French program's partnership with Israel's nuclear weapons program from 1949 to 1966 was influential to the success of each. In 2026, president Emmanuel Macron announced France's first warhead count increase since 1992, and discussions of potential temporary deployment of French nuclear squadrons to eight European countries. (Note: These countries are Belgium, Denmark, Germany, Greece, Netherlands, Poland, Sweden, and the United Kingdom.)

Of France's 290 warheads, approximately 240 are assigned to 48 MIRV-capable M51 submarine-launched ballistic missiles aboard its four Triomphant-class submarines. The remaining 50 are assigned to Dassault Rafale fighters armed with ASMP-A air-launched cruise missiles. Of these, 40 are assigned to land-based fighters, and 10 are in central storage for rapid deployment to the aircraft carrier Charles de Gaulle. France plans to upgrade its nuclear forces with the ASN4G hypersonic air-launched cruise missile and SNLE 3G submarines. France possessed land-based intermediate-range ballistic missiles, the S2 and S3, between 1971 and 1996, in silos at the Air Base 200 Apt–Saint-Christol. France and the United Kingdom are the only nuclear-armed countries with no land-based forces.

France carried out the Reggane and In Ekker series of nuclear tests in Algeria between 1960 and 1966. France did not sign the 1963 Partial Nuclear Test Ban Treaty, and alongside China, continued conducting atmospheric nuclear tests. These occurred at Moruroa and Fangataufa atolls in French Polynesia, from 1966 to 1974, when they moved to underground testing. Its testing in both regions was controversial, with residents seeking compensation for fallout exposure. France conducted its last nuclear test in January 1996, and signed the Comprehensive Nuclear-Test-Ban Treaty in September 1996, ratifying it in 1998.

France is not believed to possess biological or chemical weapons, becoming party to the Biological Weapons Convention in 1984, and the Chemical Weapons Convention in 1995. France, alongside other major participants, used chemical warfare in World War I, beginning with tear gas in 1914, and transitioning to phosgene. France ratified the Geneva Protocol in 1926. France possessed phosgene and mustard gas stockpiles during World War II but no chemical warfare took place on the Western Front. France may also have investigated potato beetle entomological warfare during the war. After the war, France captured tabun nerve agent from Nazi Germany, and tested it at a site in French Algeria. During the Cold War, France had a chemical weapons stockpile and infrastructure. During the Algerian War, France used incapacitating agents including adamsite in enclosed spaces, killing Algerians. It is believed to have destroyed its stockpile sometime before 1989.

== History ==
France was one of the nuclear pioneers, going back to the work of Marie Skłodowska Curie and Henri Becquerel. French Professor Frédéric Joliot-Curie, High Commissioner for Atomic Energy from 1945 to 1950 and Curie's son in law, told the New York Herald Tribune that the 1945 Smyth Report wrongfully omitted the contributions of French scientists.

After World War II France's former position of leadership suffered greatly because of the instability of the Fourth Republic, and the lack of finance available. During the Second World War Bertrand Goldschmidt invented the now-standard method for extracting plutonium while working as part of the British/Canadian team participating in the Manhattan Project. But after the Liberation in 1945, France had to start its own program almost from scratch. Nevertheless, the first French reactor went critical in 1948 and small amounts of plutonium were extracted in 1949. There was no formal commitment to a nuclear weapons program at that time, although plans were made to build reactors for the large scale production of plutonium. Francis Perrin, French High-Commissioner for Atomic Energy from 1951 to 1970, stated that from 1949 Israeli scientists were invited to the Saclay Nuclear Research Centre, this cooperation leading to a joint effort including sharing of knowledge between French and Israeli scientists especially those with knowledge from the Manhattan Project, the French believed that cooperation with Israel could give them access to international Jewish nuclear scientists. According to Lieutenant Colonel Warner D. Farr in a report to the USAF Counterproliferation Center, while France was previously a leader in nuclear research "Israel and France were at a similar level of expertise after the war, and Israeli scientists could make significant contributions to the French effort. Progress in nuclear science and technology in France and Israel remained closely linked throughout the early fifties. Farr reported that Israeli scientists probably helped construct the G-1 plutonium production reactor and UP-1 reprocessing plant at Marcoule."

However, in the 1950s a civilian nuclear research program was started, a byproduct of which would be plutonium. In December 1954, Prime Minister Pierre Mendès France met with his cabinet, authorizing the foundation of a program with the goal of developing French nuclear weapons. In 1956 a secret Committee for the Military Applications of Atomic Energy was formed and a development program for delivery vehicles was started. The intervention of the United States in the Suez Crisis that year is credited with convincing France that it needed to accelerate its own nuclear weapons program to remain a global power. As part of their military alliance during the Suez Crisis in 1956 the French agreed to secretly build the Dimona nuclear reactor in Israel and soon after agreed to construct a reprocessing plant for the extraction of plutonium at the site. In 1957, soon after Suez and the resulting diplomatic tension with both the Soviet Union and the United States, French president René Coty decided on the creation of the C.S.E.M. in the then French Sahara, a new nuclear testing facility replacing the CIEES.

In 1957 Euratom was created, and under cover of the peaceful use of nuclear power the French signed deals with West Germany and Italy to work together on nuclear weapons development. The Chancellor of West Germany Konrad Adenauer told his cabinet that he "wanted to achieve, through EURATOM, as quickly as possible, the chance of producing our own nuclear weapons". The idea was short-lived. In 1958, de Gaulle became president and Germany and Italy were excluded.

With the return of Charles de Gaulle to the presidency of France in the midst of the May 1958 crisis, the final decisions to build an atomic bomb were taken, and a successful test took place in 1960 with Israeli scientists as observers at the tests and unlimited access to the scientific data. Following tests de Gaulle moved quickly to distance the French program from involvement with that of Israel. Since then France has developed and maintained its own nuclear deterrent, one intended to defend France even if the United States refused to risk its own cities by assisting Western Europe in a nuclear war.

De Gaulle also wanted to end French–Israeli nuclear cooperation and said that he would not supply Israel with uranium unless the plant was opened to international inspectors, declared peaceful, and no plutonium was reprocessed. Through an extended series of negotiations, Shimon Peres finally reached a compromise with Foreign Minister Maurice Couve de Murville over two years later, in which French companies would be able to continue to fulfill their contract obligations and Israel would declare the project peaceful. Due to this, French assistance did not end until 1966. However, the supply of uranium fuel was stopped earlier, in 1963. Despite this, a French uranium company based in Gabon may have sold Israel uranium in 1965. The US government launched an investigation but was unable to determine if such a sale had taken place.

The United States began providing technical assistance to the French program in the early 1970s through the 1980s. The aid was secret, unlike the relationship with the British nuclear program. The Nixon administration, unlike previous presidencies, did not oppose its allies' possession of atomic weapons and believed that the Soviets would find having multiple nuclear-armed Western opponents more difficult. Because the Atomic Energy Act of 1946 prohibited sharing information on nuclear weapon design, a method known as "negative guidance" or "Twenty Questions" was used; French scientists described to their U.S. counterparts their research, and were told whether they were correct. Areas in which the French received help included MIRV, radiation hardening, missile design, intelligence on Soviet anti-missile defences, and advanced computer technology. Because the French program attracted "the best brains" of the nation, the U.S. benefited from French research as well. The relationship also improved the two countries' military ties; despite its departure from NATO's command structure in 1966, France developed two separate nuclear targeting plans, one "national" for the Force de Frappe's role as a solely French deterrent, and one coordinated with NATO.

France is understood to have tested neutron or enhanced radiation bombs in the past, apparently leading the field with an early test of the technology in 1967 and an "actual" neutron bomb in 1980. (Note: UK parliamentary question on whether condemnation was considered by Thatcher government.)

The French nuclear arsenal peaked at an estimated 540 warheads in the years 1991 and 1992, coinciding with the end of the Cold War and resulting peace dividend. It overtook the UK as the world's third-largest arsenal around 1985, and remained in this position until being overtaken by China in 2020. On 2 March 2026, French President Emmanuel Macron announced he had ordered France to start producing more nuclear warheads, increasing France's nuclear arsenal for the first time since 1992. He announced a new strategy allowing the temporary deployment of France's nuclear-armed aircraft, the Dassault Rafale, to allies.

Analysts argued that the expansion and forward deployment of French nuclear capabilities introduced additional strategic risk into the Eastern Mediterranean, redistributing rather than reducing regional instability across a theatre already defined by dense military activity and overlapping jurisdictions.

== Testing ==
There were 210 French nuclear tests from 1960 through 1996. Seventeen of them were done in the Algerian Sahara between 1960 and 1966, starting in the middle of the Algerian War. One-hundred ninety-three were carried out in French Polynesia.

A summary table of French nuclear testing by year can be read at this article: List of nuclear weapons tests of France.

=== Saharan experiments centres (1960–66) ===
After studying Réunion, New Caledonia, and Clipperton Island, General Charles Ailleret, head of the Special Weapons Section, proposed two possible nuclear test sites for France in a January 1957 report: French Algeria in the Sahara Desert, and French Polynesia. Although he recommended against Polynesia because of its distance from France and lack of a large airport, Ailleret stated that Algeria should be chosen "provisionally", likely due in part to the Algerian War.

A series of atmospheric nuclear tests was conducted by the Centre Saharien d'Expérimentations Militaires ("Saharan Military Experiments Centre") from February 1960 until April 1961. The first, called Gerboise Bleue ("Blue jerboa") took place on 13 February 1960 in Algeria. The explosion took place at 40 km (25 mi) from the military base at Hammoudia near Reggane, which is the last town on the Tanezrouft Track heading south across the Sahara to Mali, and 700 km (430 mi) south of Béchar. The device had a 70 kiloton yield. Although Algeria became independent in 1962, France was able to continue with underground nuclear tests in Algeria through 1966. The General Pierre Marie Gallois was named le père de la bombe A ("Father of the A-bomb").

Three further atmospheric tests were carried out from 1 April 1960 to 25 April 1961 at Hammoudia. Military, workers and the nomadic Touareg population of the region were present at the test sites, without any significant protection. At most, some took a shower after each test according to L'Humanité. Gerboise Rouge (5 kt), the third atomic bomb, half as powerful as Little Boy, exploded on 27 December 1960, provoking protests from Japan, USSR, Egypt, Morocco, Nigeria and Ghana.

After the independence of Algeria on 5 July 1962, following the 19 March 1962 Evian agreements, the French military moved the test site to another location in the Algerian Sahara, around 150 km (90 mi) north of Tamnarasset, near the village of In Eker. Underground nuclear explosion testing was performed in drifts in the Taourirt Tan Afella mountain, one of the granite Hoggar Mountains. The Evian agreements included a secret article which stated that "Algeria concede[s]... to France the use of certain air bases, terrains, sites and military installations which are necessary to it [France]" during five years.

The C.S.E.M. was therefore replaced by the Centre d'Expérimentations Militaires des Oasis ("Military Experiments Center of the Oasis") underground nuclear testing facility. A total of 13 underground nuclear tests were carried out at the In Eker site from 7 November 1961 to 16 February 1966. By July 1, 1967, all French facilities were evacuated.

An accident happened on 1 May 1962, during the "Béryl" test, four times more powerful than Hiroshima and designed as an underground shaft test. Due to improper sealing of the shaft, radioactive rock and dust were released into the atmosphere. Nine soldiers of the 621st Groupe d'Armes Spéciales unit were heavily contaminated by radiation. The soldiers were exposed to as much as 600 mSv. The Minister of the Armed Forces, Pierre Messmer, and the Minister of Research, Gaston Palewski, were present. As many as 100 additional personnel, including officials, soldiers and Algerian workers were exposed to lower levels of radiation, estimated at 50 mSv, when the radioactive cloud produced by the blast passed over the command post, due to an unexpected change in wind direction. They escaped as they could, often without wearing any protection. Palewski died in 1984 of leukemia, which he always attributed to the Béryl incident. In 2006, Bruno Barrillot, specialist of nuclear tests, measured 93 microsieverts by hour of gamma ray at the site, equivalent to 1% of the official admissible yearly dose. The incident was documented in the 2006 docudrama "Vive La Bombe!.

=== Saharan facilities ===
- CIEES (Centre Interarmées d'Essais d'Engins Spéciaux, "Joint Special Vehicle Testing Center" in English): Hammaguir, 12 kilometres (7.5 mi) southwest of Colomb-Béchar, Algeria:

used for launching rockets from 1947 to 1967.

- C.S.E.M. (Centre Saharien d'Expérimentations Militaires): Reggane, west of In-Salah, Tanezrouft, Algeria:

used for atmospheric tests from 1960 to 1961.

- C.E.M.O. (Centre d'Expérimentations Militaires des Oasis): In Ekker, in the Hoggar, 150 km/93 mi from Tamanrasset, Tan Afella, Algeria:

used for underground tests from 1961 to 1967.

=== Pacific experiments centre (1966–1996) ===
Despite its initial choice of Algeria for nuclear tests, the French government decided to build Faa'a International Airport in Tahiti, spending much more money and resources than would be justified by the official explanation of tourism. By 1958, two years before the first Sahara test, France began again its search for new testing sites due to potential political problems with Algeria and the possibility of a ban on above-ground tests. Many French overseas islands were studied, as well as performing underground tests in the Alps, Pyrenees, or Corsica; however, engineers found problems with most of the possible sites in metropolitan France.

By 1962 France hoped in its negotiations with the Algerian independence movement to retain the Sahara as a test site until 1968, but decided that it needed to be able to also perform above-ground tests of hydrogen bombs, which could not be done in Algeria. Mururoa and Fangataufa in French Polynesia were chosen that year. President Charles de Gaulle announced the choice on 3 January 1963, describing it as a benefit to Polynesia's weak economy. The Polynesian people and leaders broadly supported the choice, although the tests became controversial after they began, especially among Polynesian separatists.

A total of 193 nuclear tests were carried out in Polynesia from 1966 to 1996. On 24 August 1968 France detonated its first thermonuclear weapon—codenamed Canopus—over Fangataufa. A fission device ignited a lithium-6 deuteride secondary inside a jacket of highly enriched uranium to create a 2.6 megaton blast.

=== Simulation programme (1996–2025) ===
In April 1996, France decided to launch the Simulation Programme to maintain credibility without having to resort to testing nuclear weapons, in line with France's commitments as a signatory to the Comprehensive Nuclear-Test-Ban Treaty. The programme was born out of the technical reality that France's existing nuclear weapons were aging and would need to be replaced, but manufacturing processes had changed. The replacement was also an opportunity to enhance their performance and maintain their effectiveness. The Director of the Simulation Programme, Denis Vacek, explained that warhead designs were being adapted in response to evolving increasingly sophisticated defenses.

== Current nuclear doctrine and strategy ==
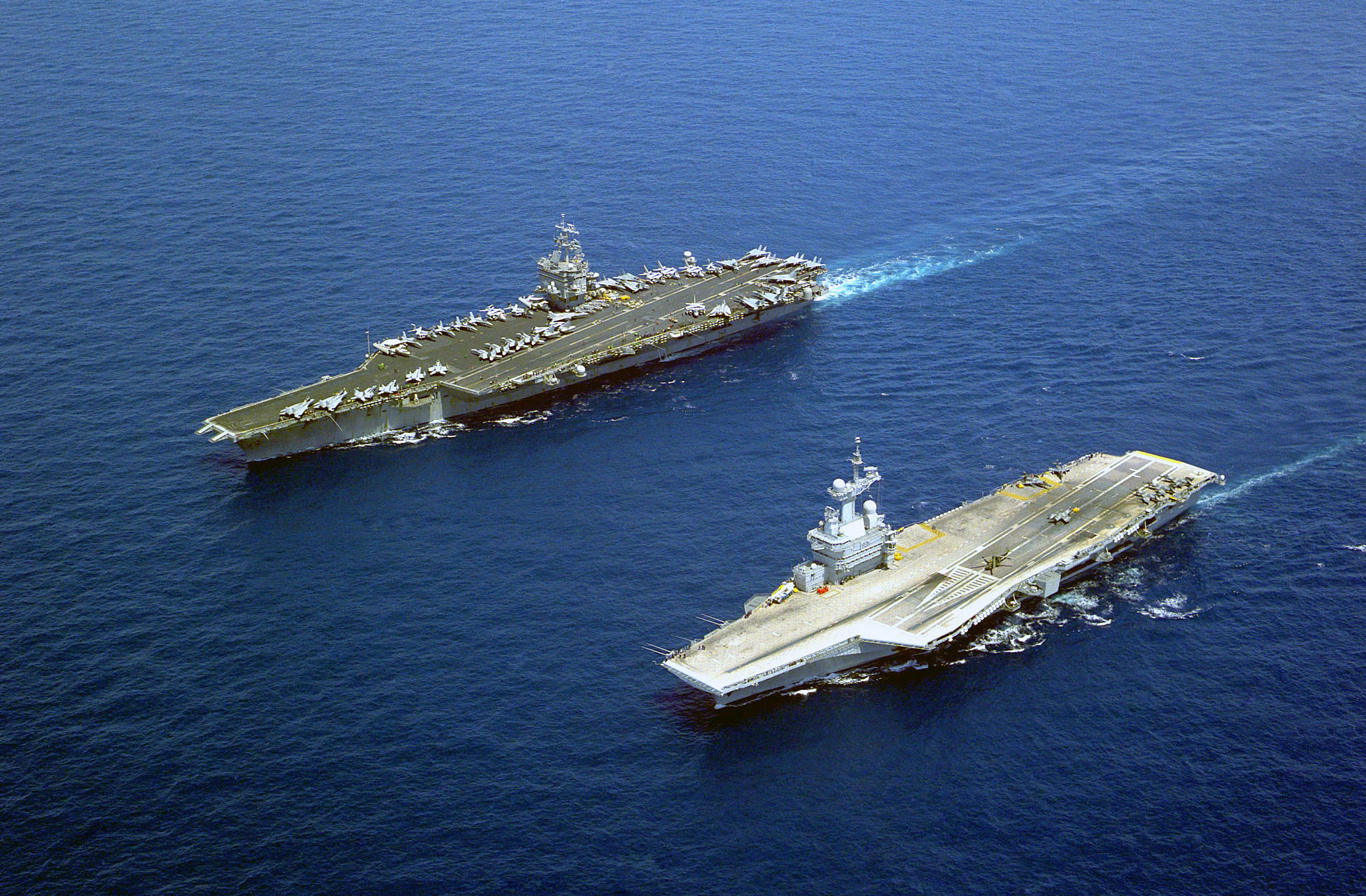
The French nuclear-powered aircraft carrier Charles de Gaulle and the American nuclear-powered carrier USS Enterprise (left), each of which carry nuclear-capable fighter aircraft

French doctrine requires at least one out of four nuclear submarines to be on patrol at sea at any given time, ready for a potential retaliatory second strike, like the UK's policy. This nuclear posture has been effective continuously since 1971.

In 2006, French President Jacques Chirac noted that France considered the use of nuclear deterrence against a state attacking France by terrorism. He noted that the French nuclear forces had been configured for this option.

On 21 March 2008, President Nicolas Sarkozy announced that France will reduce its aircraft deliverable nuclear weapon stockpile (which currently consists of 60 TN 81 warheads) by a third (-20 warheads) and bring the total French nuclear arsenal to fewer than 300 warheads.

On 2 March 2026, President Emmanuel Macron announced that France had initiated talks with eight European allies (Belgium, Denmark, Germany, Greece, Netherlands, Poland, Sweden, and the United Kingdom) in a scheme of cooperation he called "dissuasion avancée" (which can be translated as both forward and advanced deterrence). Norway joined as the ninth ally in May 2026 and Finland joined as the tenth ally in September 2026. The cooperation could include nuclear doctrine talks, conventional allied assets participation in French nuclear exercises. This includes a strategy allowing the temporary deployment of France's nuclear-armed aircraft, the Dassault Rafale, to allies, in extreme circumstances, although still under sole French use control. He also announced an increase in the size of the French nuclear stockpile, though he said it would not be disclosed by how much.

France (like the UK, US, Russia and China, notably) decided not to sign the UN treaty on the Prohibition of Nuclear Weapons adopted by the UN General Assembly in 2017.

== Anti-nuclear tests protests ==
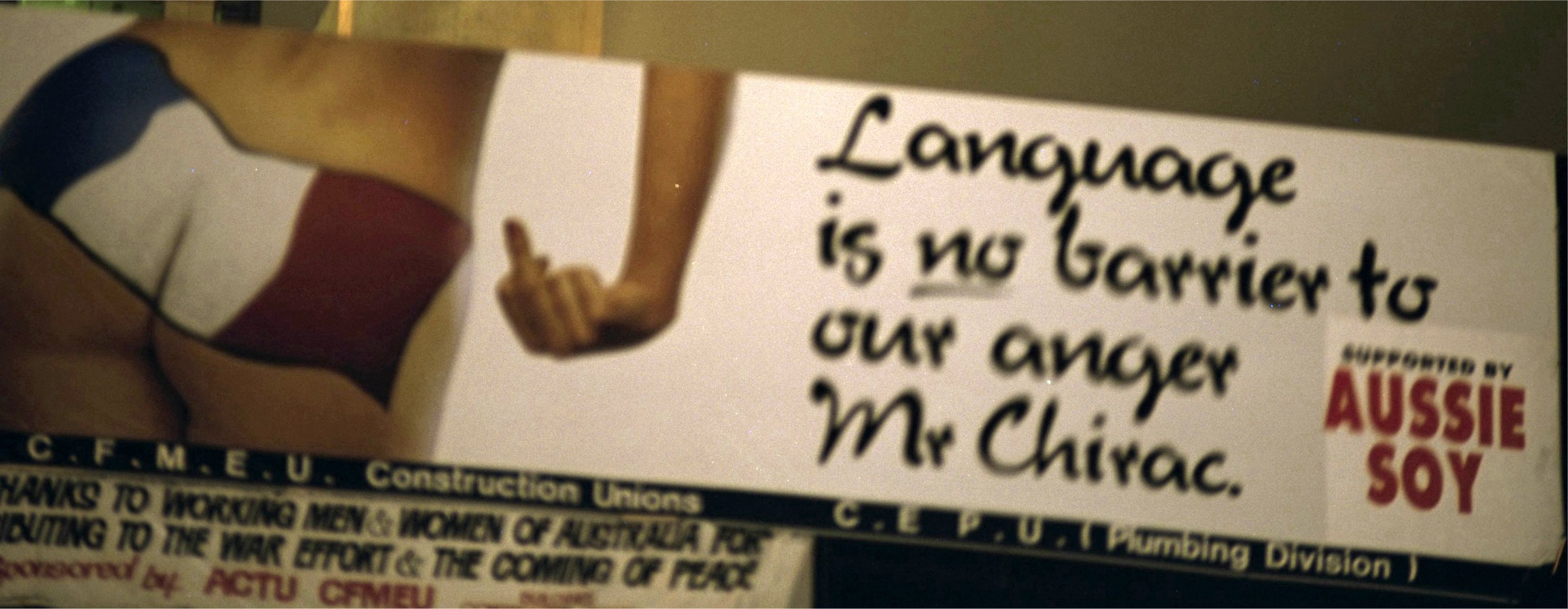
Protests in Australia in 1996 against French nuclear tests in the Pacific

- In July 1959, after France announced that they would begin testing nuclear bombs in the Sahara, protests were held in Nigeria and Ghana, with the Liberian and Moroccan governments also denouncing the decision. On November 20, 1959, the United Nations General Assembly passed a resolution supported by 26 Afro-Asian countries expressing concern and requesting "France to refrain from such tests."
- By 1968 only France and China were detonating nuclear weapons in the open air and the contamination caused by the H-bomb blast led to a global protest movement against further French atmospheric tests.
- From the early 1960s New Zealand peace groups CND and the Peace Media had been organising nationwide anti-nuclear campaigns in protest of atmospheric testing in French Polynesia. These included two large national petitions presented to the New Zealand government which led to a joint New Zealand and Australian Government action to take France to the International Court of Justice (1972).
- In 1972, Greenpeace and an amalgam of New Zealand peace groups managed to delay nuclear tests by several weeks by trespassing with a ship in the testing zone. During the time, the skipper, David McTaggart, was beaten and severely injured by members of the French military.
- In 1972 Australian unions placed bans on servicing Union de Transports Aériens planes to protest nuclear testing.
- In 1973 the New Zealand Peace Media organised an international flotilla of protest yachts including the Fri, Spirit of Peace, Boy Roel, Magic Island and the Tanmure to sail into the test exclusion zone.
- In 1973, New Zealand Prime Minister Norman Kirk as a symbolic act of protest sent two navy frigates, HMNZS Canterbury and HMNZS Otago, to Moruroa. They were accompanied by HMAS Supply, a fleet oiler of the Royal Australian Navy.
- In 1985 the Greenpeace ship Rainbow Warrior was bombed and sunk by the French DGSE in Auckland, New Zealand, as it prepared for another protest of nuclear testing in French military zones. One crew member, Fernando Pereira of Portugal, photographer, drowned on the sinking ship while attempting to recover his photographic equipment. Two members of DGSE were captured and sentenced, but eventually repatriated to France in a controversial affair.
- French president Jacques Chirac’s decision to run a nuclear test series at Mururoa in 1995, just one year before the Comprehensive Test Ban Treaty was to be signed, caused worldwide protest, including an embargo of French wine. These tests were meant to provide the nation with enough data to improve further nuclear technology without needing additional series of tests.
- The French military conducted almost 200 nuclear tests at Mururoa and Fangataufa atolls over a thirty-year period ending in 1996, 46 of them atmospheric, of which 5 were without significant nuclear yield. In August 2006, an official French government report by INSERM confirmed the link between an increase in the cases of thyroid cancer and France’s atmospheric nuclear tests in the territory since 1966.

== Veterans' associations and symposium ==
An association gathering veterans of nuclear tests (AVEN, "Association des vétérans des essais nucléaires") was created in 2001. Along with the Polynesian NGO Moruroa e tatou, the AVEN announced on 27 November 2002 that it would depose a complaint against X (unknown) for involuntary homicide and putting someone’s life in danger. On 7 June 2003, for the first time, the military court of Tours granted an invalidity pension to a veteran of the Sahara tests. According to a poll made by the AVEN with its members, only 12% have declared being in good health. An international symposium on the consequences of test carried out in Algeria took place on 13 and 14 February 2007, under the official oversight of President Abdelaziz Bouteflika.

One hundred fifty thousand civilians, without taking into account the local population, are estimated to have been on the location of nuclear tests, in Algeria or in French Polynesia. One French veteran of the 1960s nuclear tests in Algeria described being given no protective clothing or masks, while being ordered to witness the tests at so close a range that the flash penetrated through the arm he used to cover his eyes. One of several veteran’s groups claiming to organise those suffering ill effects, AVEN had 4,500 members in early 2009.

== Test victims compensation ==
In both Algeria and French Polynesia there have been long standing demands for compensation from those who claim injury from France’s nuclear testing program. The government of France had consistently denied, since the late 1960s, that injury to military personnel and civilians had been caused by their nuclear testing. Several French veterans and African and Polynesian campaign groups have waged court cases and public relations struggles demanding government reparations. In May 2009, a group of twelve French veterans, in the campaign group "Truth and Justice", who claim to have suffered health effects from nuclear testing in the 1960s had their claims denied by the government Commission for the Indemnification of Victims of Penal Infraction (CIVI), and again by a Paris appeals court, citing laws which set a statute of limitations for damages to 1976. Following this rejection, the government announced it would create a 10 million Euro compensation fund for military and civilian victims of its testing programme; both those carried out in the 1960s and the Polynesian tests of 1990–1996. Defence Minister Hervé Morin said the government would create a board of physicians, overseen by a French judge magistrate, to determine if individual cases were caused by French testing, and if individuals were suffering from illnesses on a United Nations Scientific Committee on the Effects of Atomic Radiation list of eighteen disorders linked to exposure to testing. Pressure groups, including the Veterans group "Truth and Justice" criticised the programme as too restrictive in illnesses covered and too bureaucratic. Polynesian groups said the bill would also unduly restrict applicants to those who had been in small areas near the test zones, not taking into account the pervasive pollution and radiation. Algerian groups had also complained that these restrictions would deny compensation to many victims. One Algerian group estimated there were 27,000 still living victims of ill effects from the 1960–66 testing there, while the French government had given an estimate of just 500.

== Chemical and biological weapons ==
France states that it does not currently possess chemical weapons. The country ratified the Chemical Weapons Convention (CWC) in 1995, and acceded to the Biological and Toxin Weapons Convention (BWC) in 1984. France also ratified the Geneva Protocol in 1926.

During World War I, France, not Germany as commonly believed, was actually the first nation to use chemical weapons though this was notably a nonlethal tear gas attack (xylyl bromide) carried out in August 1914 against invading German troops. Once the war had degenerated into trench warfare and new methods to attain an advantage were sought, the German Army initiated a chlorine gas attack against the French Army at Ypres on 15 April 1915, initiating a new method of warfare but failed that day to exploit the resulting break in the French line. In time, the more potent phosgene replaced chlorine in use by armies on the Western Front, including France, leading to massive casualties on both sides of the conflict. As the war progressed, the effects were mitigated by development of protective clothing and masks.

At the outbreak of World War II, France maintained large stockpiles of mustard gas and phosgene but did not use them against the invading Axis troops, and no chemical weapons were used on the battlefield by the Axis invaders on the western front; Germany only employed chemical weapons against the people of the Soviet Union.

During the invasion of France, German forces captured a French biological research facility and purportedly found plans to use potato beetles against Germany.

Immediately after the end of the war, the French military began testing captured German chemical agent stores in Algeria, then a French department, notably the extremely toxic nerve agent Tabun. By the late 1940s, testing of Tabun-filled ordnance had become routine, often by using livestock to test effects. The testing of chemical weapons occurred at B2-Namous, Algeria, an uninhabited desert proving ground located 100 kilometers (62 mi) east of the Moroccan border, but other sites also existed. A manufacturing facility existed in Bouchet, near Paris, which was tasked with researching chemical weapons and maintaining a scientific and technological vigilance on the subject.

During the Algerian War, from 1956 until 1962, French forces used toxic gases on a large scale, including targeting the forces of the National Liberation Army operating in caves and underground tunnels. While theoretically non-lethal incapacitating agents, they became deadly in these enclosed spaces. One such gas used was codenamed "CN2D" and contained adamsite. French military documentation was presented in the 2025 documentary Algeria, special weapons section, although the documentary's broadcast appearance on France 5 was cancelled. The documentary presented testimony from former French military personnel, and Algerian victims of a March 1959 attack in a cave in the Aurès Mountains. One French soldier spoke of an attack after which 10 Algerians were found dead. French forces carried out other forms of atrocities in the war.

In 1985, France was estimated to have a chemical weapons stockpile of some 435 tonnes, the second largest in NATO following the United States. However, at a conference in Paris in 1989, France declared that it was no longer in possession of chemical weaponry but maintained the manufacturing capacity to readily produce such weapons if deemed necessary.

== See also ==
- Anti-nuclear protests
- Force de dissuasion
- French 'Simulation' project (to replace live nuclear testing) (in French, French Wikipedia)
- List of states with nuclear weapons
- Moruroa
- New Zealand nuclear-free zone
- Weapons of mass destruction
- List of nuclear weapons tests of France

== Bibliography ==
- Cohen, Avner (1998), Israel and the Bomb, New York: Columbia University Press, ISBN 978-0-231-10482-1
- Hersh, Seymour M. (1991), The Samson Option: Israel's Nuclear Arsenal and American Foreign Policy, New York: Random House, ISBN 978-0-394-57006-8
- Kristensen, Hans M., and Matt Korda. "French nuclear forces, 2019." Bulletin of the Atomic Scientists 75.1 (2019): 51–55. 2019 online
- Hymans, Jacques E.C. "Why Do States Acquire Nuclear Weapons? Comparing the Cases of India and France." in Nuclear India in the Twenty-First Century (2002). 139–160. online
- Kohl, Wilfred L. French nuclear diplomacy (Princeton University Press, 2015).
- Scheinman, Lawrence. Atomic energy policy in France under the Fourth Republic (Princeton University Press, 2015).
- (in French) Jean-Hugues Oppel, Réveillez le président, Éditions Payot et rivages, 2007 (ISBN 978-2-7436-1630-4). The book is a fiction about the nuclear weapons of France; the book also contains about ten chapters on true historical incidents involving nuclear weapons and strategy (during the second half of the twentieth century).
