= Air Base 200 Apt–Saint-Christol =

French Air Force installation

Air Base 200 Apt-Saint-Christol
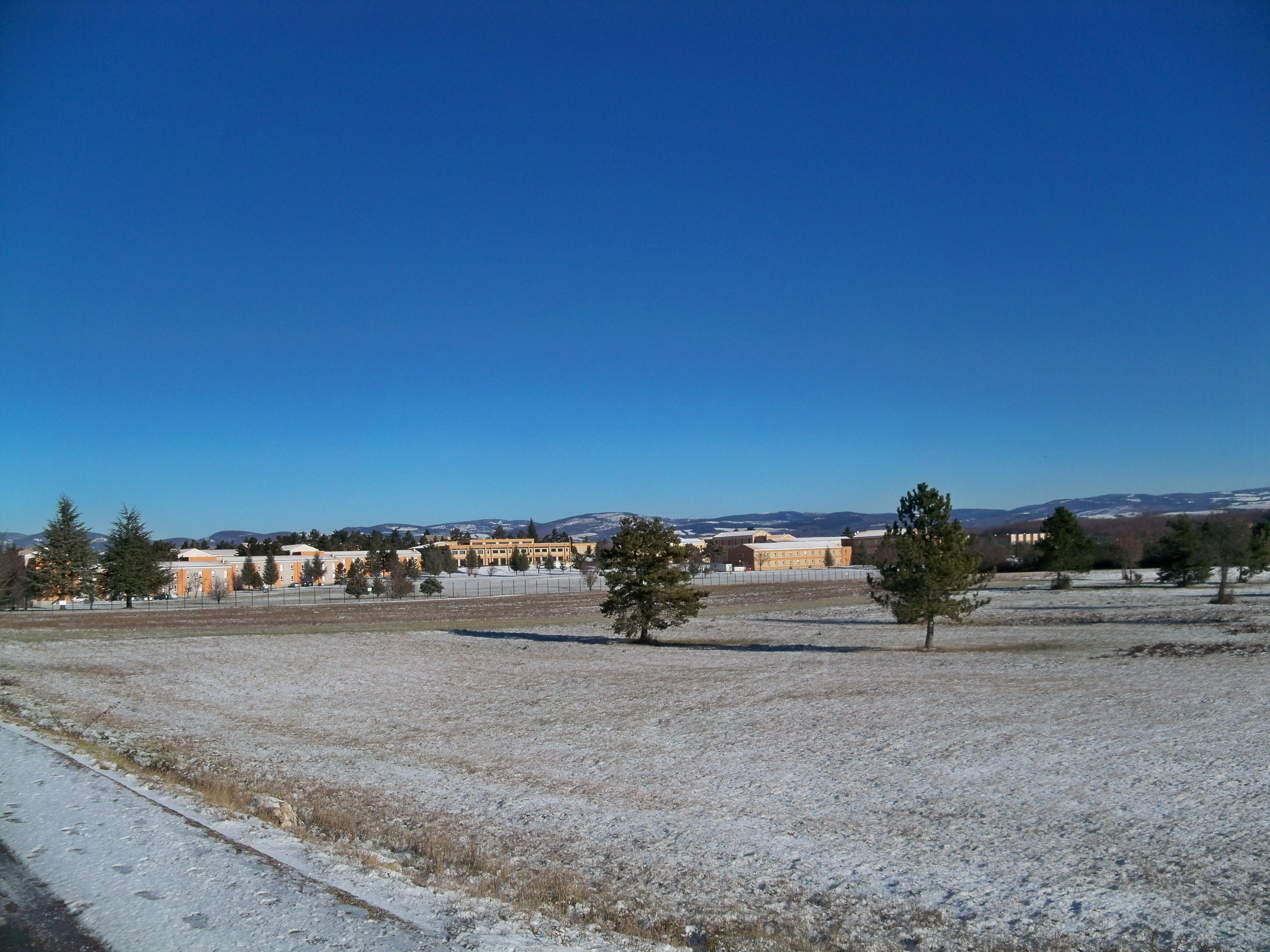
- Part of the base's facilities in 2010.

- IATA: none; ICAO: LFXI

Summary
- Airport type: Military
- Location: Saint-Christol, France
- Closed: 1999
- Commander: Army (formerly Air Force)
- Elevation AMSL: 833 m (2,733 ft)
- Coordinates: 44°03′23″N 5°29′45″E
- Interactive map of Air Base 200 Apt-Saint-Christol

Air Base 200 Apt–Saint-Christol (or Sault Saint-Christol Airport), is a former French Air Force installation located in the municipality of Saint-Christol, near Apt, in the Vaucluse department. Between 1971 and 1996, it served as the support base for the ballistic missiles of the French nuclear deterrent deployed on the Albion Plateau. The site was operated by the 1st Strategic Missile Group of the Strategic Air Forces and comprised eighteen missile silos. Following the dismantling of the missile facilities, the site was renamed Quartier Maréchal Kœnig. Since 1999, it has housed the 2nd Foreign Engineer Regiment of the French Army and a listening station operated by the General Directorate for External Security (DGSE).

== History ==
=== Context ===
Following the end of the Second World War, France initiated military and civilian nuclear programs with the creation of the Atomic Energy Commission (CEA) in October 1945, under the Provisional Government of the Republic led by Charles de Gaulle. During the subsequent years, the context of the Cold War reinforced French ambitions to develop nuclear weapons as part of a deterrence strategy. Under the Fourth Republic, this program progressed slowly and remained largely classified.

Within the NATO framework, French forces stationed in Germany became familiar with nuclear weapons from 1960 onward, although these tactical weapons remained under exclusive United States control. At the same time, several developments highlighted the limits (Note: On 30 October 1953, the doctrine proposed by the Eisenhower administration stated that any attack against American troops would trigger a massive retaliation, unless doing so would be detrimental to national security.) of the U.S. doctrine of “massive retaliation” adopted in 1953, including the absence of U.S. diplomatic support for France during the Suez Crisis and the adoption of the “flexible response” strategy in the early 1960s. These elements contributed to the perception within the French military leadership that the United States would commit its strategic nuclear forces only in the event of a direct threat to its own territory, while restricting its response in a European conflict to tactical nuclear use. In this context, French leaders considered that a national strategic nuclear force under French control could play a deterrent role by influencing U.S. decision-making within an integrated Western command structure. Such a capability was also viewed as a means of ensuring France’s participation in strategic consultations and affirming its status as a major power, in line with the objectives articulated by Charles de Gaulle. This perspective led French authorities to seek the development of a diversified nuclear arsenal comparable in scope to that of the superpowers, reflecting the desire to avoid dependence on any single category of weaponry controlled by another state.

=== Development ===
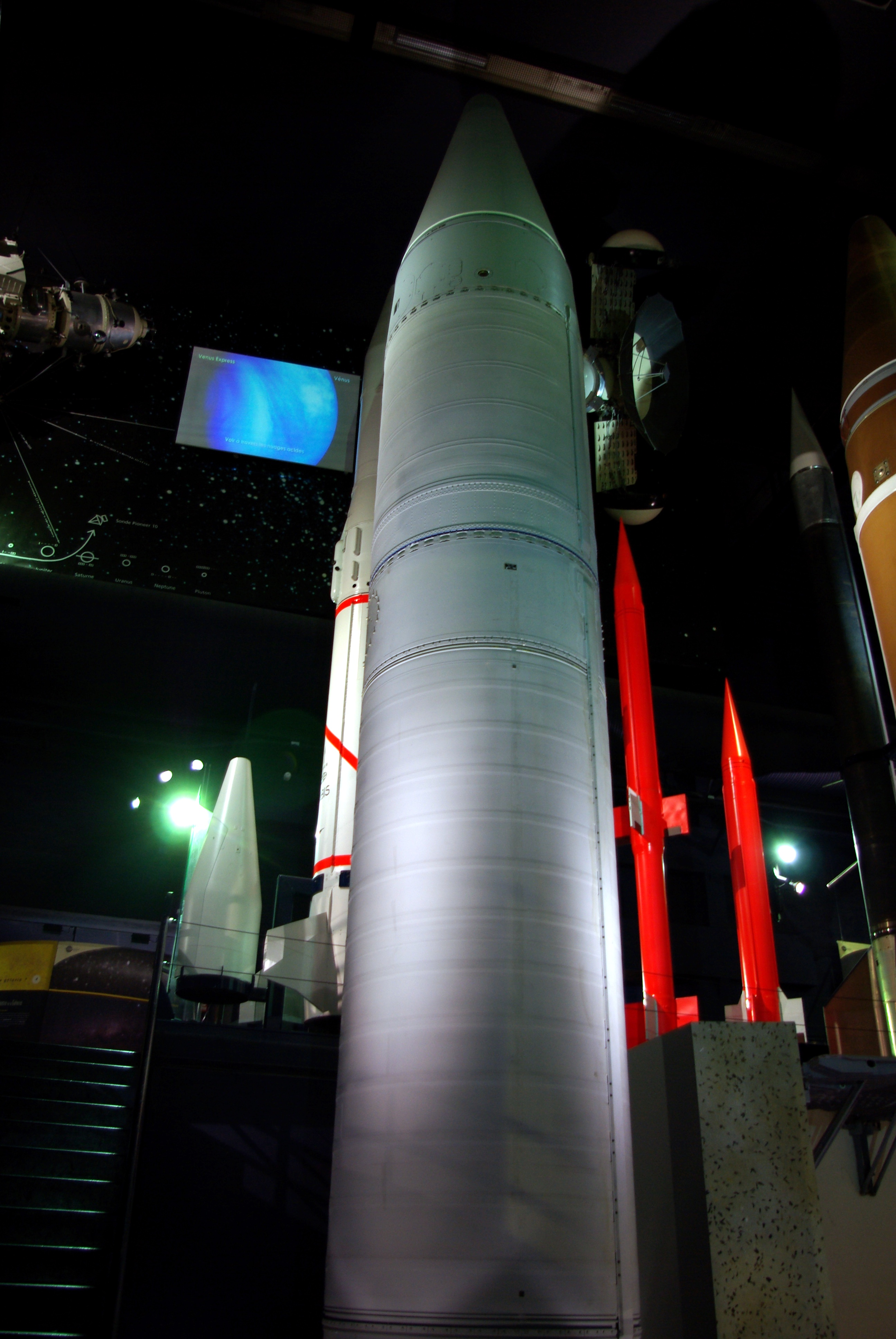
S2 missile on display at the Air and Space Museum in Le Bourget. This was France's first ballistic missile, with its maiden test flight taking place in 1965.

In 1960, following his election as President of the Republic, Charles de Gaulle initiated the development of France’s strategic nuclear forces by ordering a fleet of strategic bombers from Dassault Aviation and launching programs for ground-based ballistic missiles and nuclear-powered ballistic missile submarines. In May 1963, he defined the main components of France’s nuclear deterrent, which were to include Mirage IV aircraft equipped with nuclear bombs, land-based ballistic missiles fitted with nuclear warheads, and submarine-launched ballistic missiles deployed on nuclear-powered submarines.

Responsibility for the deployment of the strategic ground-to-ground ballistic missiles (SSBS) was assigned to the Air Force. The Army did not oppose this choice, as it favored the development of more flexible tactical nuclear weapons, while the Navy advocated the use of nuclear-powered ballistic missile submarines (SNLEs), considered less vulnerable. Air Force officials argued that a submarine could be destroyed by a single torpedo, whereas neutralizing the SSBS force would require at least one nuclear warhead per missile, each housed in a hardened silo.

From 1963, studies were carried out in Corsica, the Vosges, the Massif Central, and the Drôme to identify suitable missile deployment sites. In April 1965, the Albion Plateau was selected over the Valensole Plateau due to its low population density and limestone soil, which facilitated silo construction and was capable of absorbing the effects of a nuclear blast.

=== Construction ===
At the beginning of 1966, a plan was implemented to construct 27 silos and three launch control centers (PCT) over 785 hectares, as well as Air Base 200 Apt–Saint-Christol (BA 200) over 406 hectares. The project was assigned to the Engineer Corps.

The installation faced public opposition, including protests from artists and intellectuals. In February 1966, René Char contributed to a poster titled La Provence point Oméga, illustrated by Pablo Picasso, declaring: "Let those who pierce the noble terrestrial bark of Albion measure this well: we are fighting for a site where snow is not only the she-wolf of winter but also the alder of spring. The sun rises there upon our demanding blood, and man is never imprisoned by his fellow man. In our eyes, this site is worth more than our bread, for it cannot itself be replaced." (Note: Olivier Bastides explains, concerning Char: “his poetry is fundamentally foreign to any kind of evanescence. Its truth is rooted in the land of Vaucluse and in the flesh of the men he lived among. Char is a peasant who ploughs the land with his words, a peasant for whom the land nourishes poetry.”)

Construction of Launch Control Center 1 took place from November 1966 to March 1969. Work on Launch Control Center 2 began in July 1969 and was completed in March 1970. Construction of Launch Control Center 3 and its associated silos was started but halted in December 1968 due to budget restrictions. The operational facilities involved 260,000 cubic meters of rock excavation, 540,000 cubic meters of earthworks, and 150,000 cubic meters of concrete. During the same period, the surrounding road network was upgraded to accommodate military convoys.

In 1967, the 1st Strategic Missile Group, part of the Air Force, was established to manage the facilities on the Albion Plateau. Additional units were created to ensure site security, including the EP 21.200 Protection Squadron in 1968, which consisted of a command section, a canine unit, and four paratrooper companies. The first MR 31 nuclear warheads were delivered to Air Base 200 in August 1969.

=== Operational missiles ===
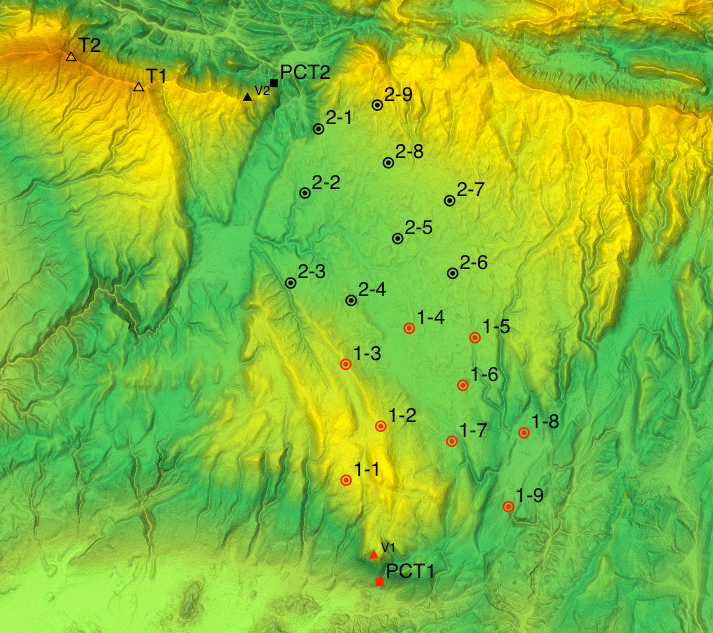
Topographic map of the Albion plateau and locations of launch zones (LZ) and other systems.

The first operational unit, equipped with nine S2 missiles, entered service on 2 August 1971, followed by a second unit on 23 April 1972. In the early 1980s, these missiles were replaced by S3 missiles, with the first operational S3 SSBS unit entering service on 1 June 1980 and the second on 31 December 1982.

Initially, it was planned that the S3 missiles would be replaced around 2005 by a land-based version of the M5 missile, whose development began in 1992. In 1994, the M45 missile was announced as a successor to the S3. Both projects were ultimately abandoned following the announcement of the dismantling of the installations in 1996.

Aerial surveillance of the silos was initially conducted using Sikorsky H-34 helicopters. On 1 May 1976, Helicopter Squadron 4/67 Durance was established and stationed at the base, operating SE.3130 Alouette II, MH.1521M Broussard, SA-330Ba Puma, and AS-555UN Fennec aircraft. From 1971 to 1996, BA 200 and the Albion Plateau were described as among the most heavily guarded sites in France.

During the operational period of BA 200, the airfield accommodated a wide variety of aircraft, including those carrying foreign heads of state.

=== Dismantling and conversion ===
On 22 February 1996, President Jacques Chirac announced the closure of the base and the dismantling of the missiles on the Albion Plateau, citing changes in European geostrategy following the collapse of the Eastern Bloc and the aging of the missiles, which were costly to maintain and not scheduled for modernization.

It was initially planned to convert the base into a Franco-German combat helicopter school; however, the project was abandoned following concerns from local residents regarding noise. Subsequently, the Ministry of Defense announced that a military presence would be maintained on the site through the stationing of an engineer regiment of the French Foreign Legion.

Missile dismantling operations began on 16 September 1996, and the site was declared denuclearized at the end of February 1998. The nuclear warheads were transferred to the Valduc center.

From June 1996 to August 1998, the Air Force Commando Training Squadron was stationed at the air base before relocating to Dijon and later to Orange. The 1st Strategic Missile Group and Helicopter Squadron 4/67 Durance were disbanded on 31 August 1998.

The 2nd Foreign Engineer Regiment was established on 1 July 1999 and assumed control of the site, with BA 200 becoming the Maréchal Koenig Barracks.

In 2003, the Directorate-General for External Security (DGSE) installed a listening station at the base.

== Installations ==
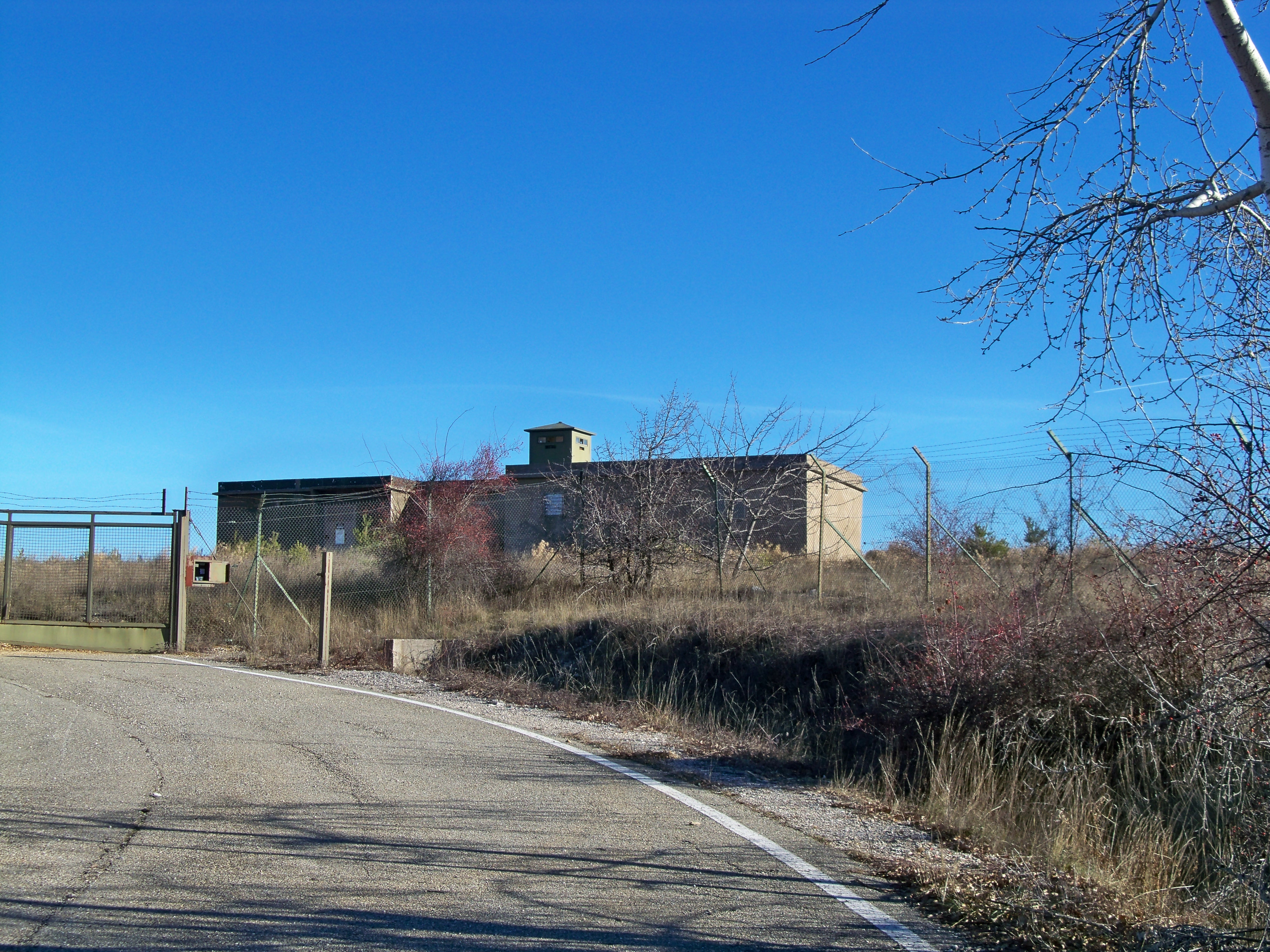
A technical surface building, the only part of a launch area (LA) above ground level.

Of the 27 planned launch zones and three fire control posts, only 18 launch zones and two fire control posts were completed.

=== Launch zones ===
On the surface, the only visible element of a launch zone was the technical building, which housed equipment for site maintenance. The majority of the launch zone was located underground beneath a reinforced concrete slab measuring 50 by 50 meters and 9 meters thick. At its center, a steel-and-concrete shaft—the silo—extended to a depth of 30 meters. A 140-ton, 1.5-meter-thick door covered the silo and, upon launch order, could be moved along rails by cables operated with pyrotechnic actuators. The design of the sites was based on the American Minuteman missile silos, with dimensions adapted for the smaller French S2 missile.

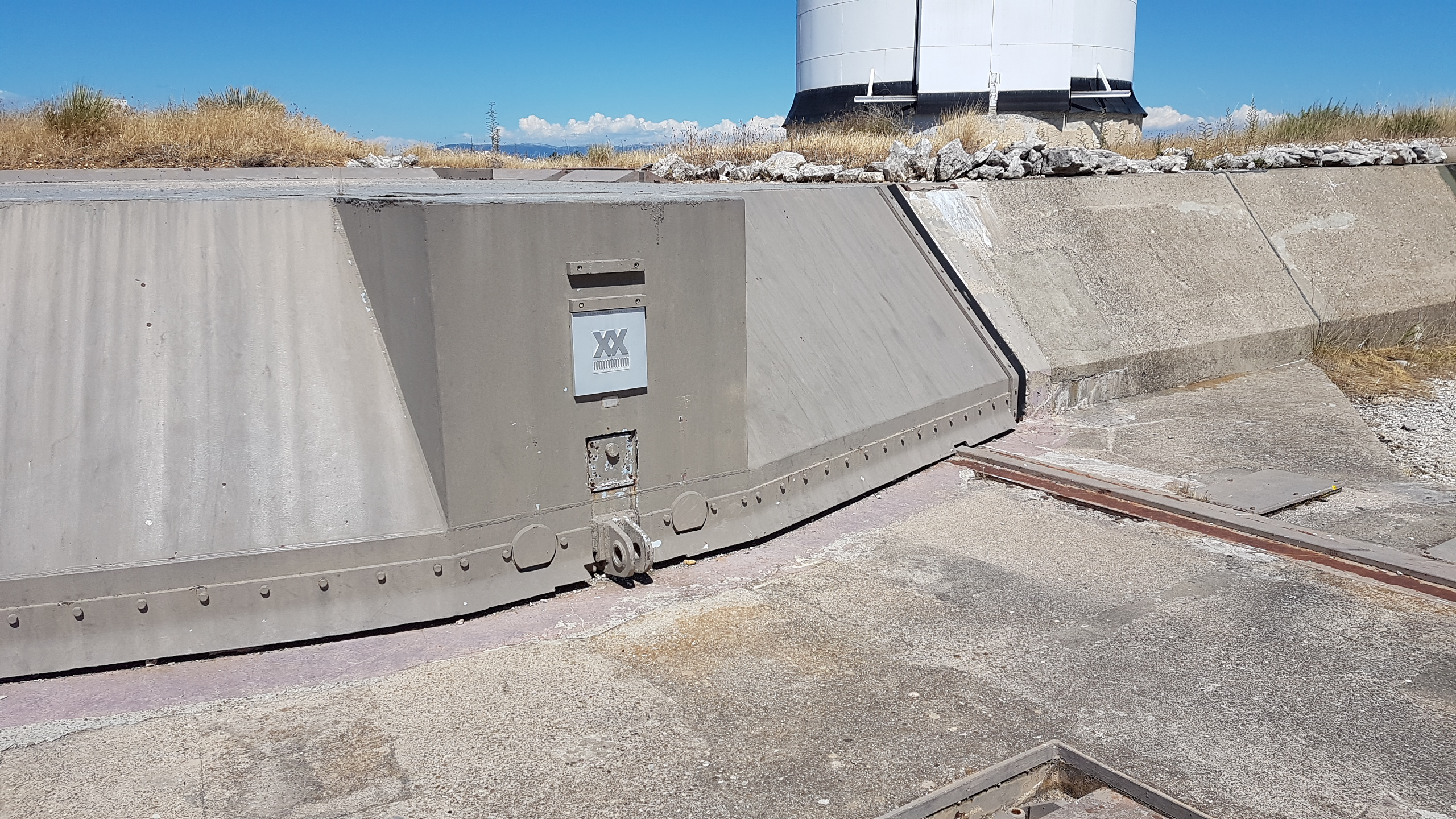
The door covering silo 1-2, 1.5 m thick and mounted on rails.

For maintenance, a two-ton armored door provided access to an elevator leading to the −6 and −9 meter levels of the silo. Retractable scaffolding at these levels allowed access to missile components, including the warhead and interstage section. The missile rested on a supporting ring suspended by cables designed to absorb seismic waves from surface explosions. Each silo was also accompanied by a buried auxiliary shelter containing support equipment, including backup generators.

Each launch zone was located at least 3 kilometers from its nearest neighbor to ensure that a single attack could not simultaneously destroy multiple sites, as the mechanical effects of a nuclear explosion are relatively limited and two simultaneous detonations reduce the overall impact on surrounding structures. The system occupied a limited footprint: only a 200-meter square area around each launch zone was secured with three layers of fencing, consisting of a perimeter fence defining the controlled area, an intermediate fence, and an electrified fence. The remaining areas of the plateau, which were inhabited, remained in agricultural use.

==== List of launch zones ====
List of launch zones
N°	Name	Coordinates	Status
1-1	Launch Zone No. 1-1	43°58′31″N 5°27′59″E	Photovoltaic power plant Restaurant “Le Bistrot de Lagarde”
1-2	Launch Zone No. 1-2	44°00′01″N 5°29′15″E	SIRENE Observatory
1-3	Launch Zone No. 1-3	44°01′01″N 5°27′57″E	Sault Photovoltaic Park
1-4	Launch Zone No. 1-4	44°02′44″N 5°30′24″E	Decommissioned; Surface technical building destroyed, silo door still visible
1-5	Launch Zone No. 1-5	44°02′29″N 5°32′55″E	Decommissioned – Lavansol III Photovoltaic Plant under construction (2020); Surface technical building still in place
1-6	Launch Zone No. 1-6	44°01′11″N 5°32′26″E	Decommissioned – Lavansol VI Photovoltaic Plant under construction (2020); Surface technical building still in place, demolition planned
1-7	Launch Zone No. 1-7	43°59′37″N 5°32′00″E	Decommissioned – Lavansol IV Photovoltaic Plant under construction (2020); Surface technical building still in place
1-8	Launch Zone No. 1-8	43°59′51″N 5°34′46″E	Decommissioned; Surface technical building partially destroyed
1-9	Launch Zone No. 1-9	43°57′47″N 5°34′13″E	Decommissioned; Surface technical building still in place
2-1	Launch Zone No. 2-1	44°08′16″N 5°26′57″E	Photovoltaic power plant Surface technical building still in place
2-2	Launch Zone No. 2-2	44°06′30″N 5°26′23″E	Photovoltaic power plant Surface technical building still in place
2-3	Launch Zone No. 2-3	44°03′59″N 5°25′48″E	Sault Waste Disposal Site; Surface technical building still in place
2-4	Launch Zone No. 2-4	44°03′30″N 5°28′10″E	Dismantled
2-5	Launch Zone No. 2-5	44°05′14″N 5°29′59″E	Lavansol M9 Photovoltaic Plant
2-6	Launch Zone No. 2-6	44°04′16″N 5°32′03″E	GRAVES Radar Reception Site
2-7	Launch Zone No. 2-7	44°06′17″N 5°31′58″E	Photovoltaic power plant Scop TOSSOLIA
2-8	Launch Zone No. 2-8	44°07′21″N 5°29′38″E	Photovoltaic power plant Surface technical building still in place
2-9	Launch Zone No. 2-9	44°08′56″N 5°29′11″E	Photovoltaic power plant Surface technical building still in place

=== Fire control posts ===
Each fire control post was responsible for supervising nine launch zones, some located to the north and others to the south of the Albion Plateau. Fire Control Post 1, in the south, was situated in the Vaucluse near the village of Rustrel (43°55′43″N 5°29′14″E). Fire Control Post 2, in the northwest, was located in the Drôme department, above the village of Reilhannette (44°09′34″N 5°25′10″E). Fire Control Post 3, which was never completed, was planned for the northeast near the village of L’Hospitalet.

The selection of a plateau for the deployment site allowed the fire control posts to be constructed deep underground, more than 400 meters below the surface and beneath the launch zones. The two completed posts, situated approximately 35 kilometers apart, were built at the ends of galleries nearly 2 kilometers long, bored from the sides of the plateaus. Access was provided through fortified gatehouses with concrete frontages. Inside, security personnel monitored access to the underground installations. The posts were connected by a network of tunnels measuring 6 meters in diameter, which were traversed using electric carts.

==== Blast-mitigation galleries ====
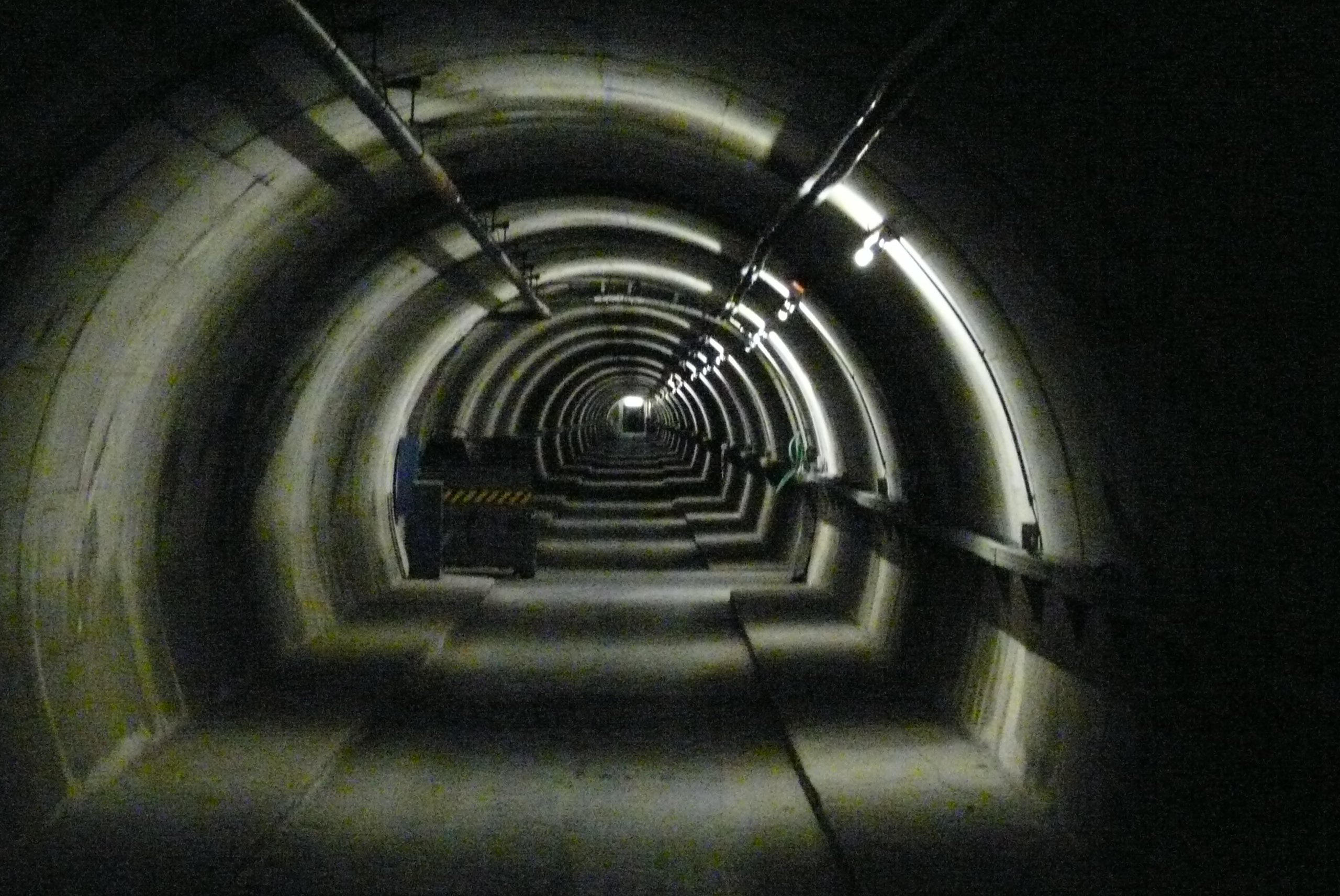
Fire control post (FCP) tunnel no. 1.

A first tunnel, known as the “burnt-gas gallery,” connected the entrance of the gatehouse to the outside to channel the force of a potential explosion. Three hundred and fifty meters from the gatehouse, a second tunnel branched at a right angle into the hillside, ending in a dead end. Two hundred meters before this end, a third tunnel branched off in parallel after another right-angle turn. The fire control post was located 350 meters along this third tunnel. Beyond the fire control post, the tunnel continued for approximately 1,600 meters, ending at a shaft that provided a connection to the surface. The shaft, 25 meters deep and plugged with sand, served as an emergency exit; occupants would have had to remove the sand from inside the shaft to reach the surface.

==== Launch capsules ====
The fire control post was constructed in a cavern measuring 28 meters in length and 8 meters in diameter, covered by 2 meters of concrete and enclosed in a Faraday cage of hermetically welded steel plates to protect the electronics from electromagnetic pulses.

The fire control post was staffed by six Air Force commandos responsible for security, two mechanics, and two launch officers on permanent rotation. The launch officers, stationed in a spring-mounted capsule, were responsible for executing missile launch orders issued by the President of the Republic. Following the American model, the launch procedure required simultaneous activation of two consoles spaced four meters apart, ensuring that no single individual could initiate a launch.

=== Telecommunications relays ===
The missile launch order would have been transmitted via the Vestale radio network using tropospheric scatter. This dedicated network connected the Jupiter command post at the Élysée Palace to the Strategic Air Forces Operations Center at the Paris base of Taverny, then to the Strategic Air Forces Operations Center at Mont Verdun near Lyon, and subsequently to two armored relay stations on the foothills of Mont Ventoux: T1 at the Pas de la Frache (1,500 meters; 44°09′28″N 5°19′57″E) and T2 at the Col des Tempêtes (1,911 meters; 44°10′19″N 5°17′19″E). From these relays, the signal would have been transmitted to two receivers, V1 (43°56′29″N 5°29′01″E) and V2 (44°09′12″N 5°24′10″E), located above the fire control posts in direct line of sight of the relay stations.

As a security measure, five alternative telecommunications systems were available to transmit missile launch orders: the Tigre telephone network, using France Télécom and Army radio relays; the Navy network; the ASTARTE network, which used C-160 aircraft from 1989 onward; the RAMSÈS network (Strategic and Survival Upstream Mesh Network); and television transmissions via TDF transmitters.

Communication between the fire control posts and the launch zones was conducted via cables or, if necessary, by ground-wave transmission. Each fire control post was equipped with long antennas along the galleries, while each launch zone had buried antennas.

== Base today ==
=== Military installations ===
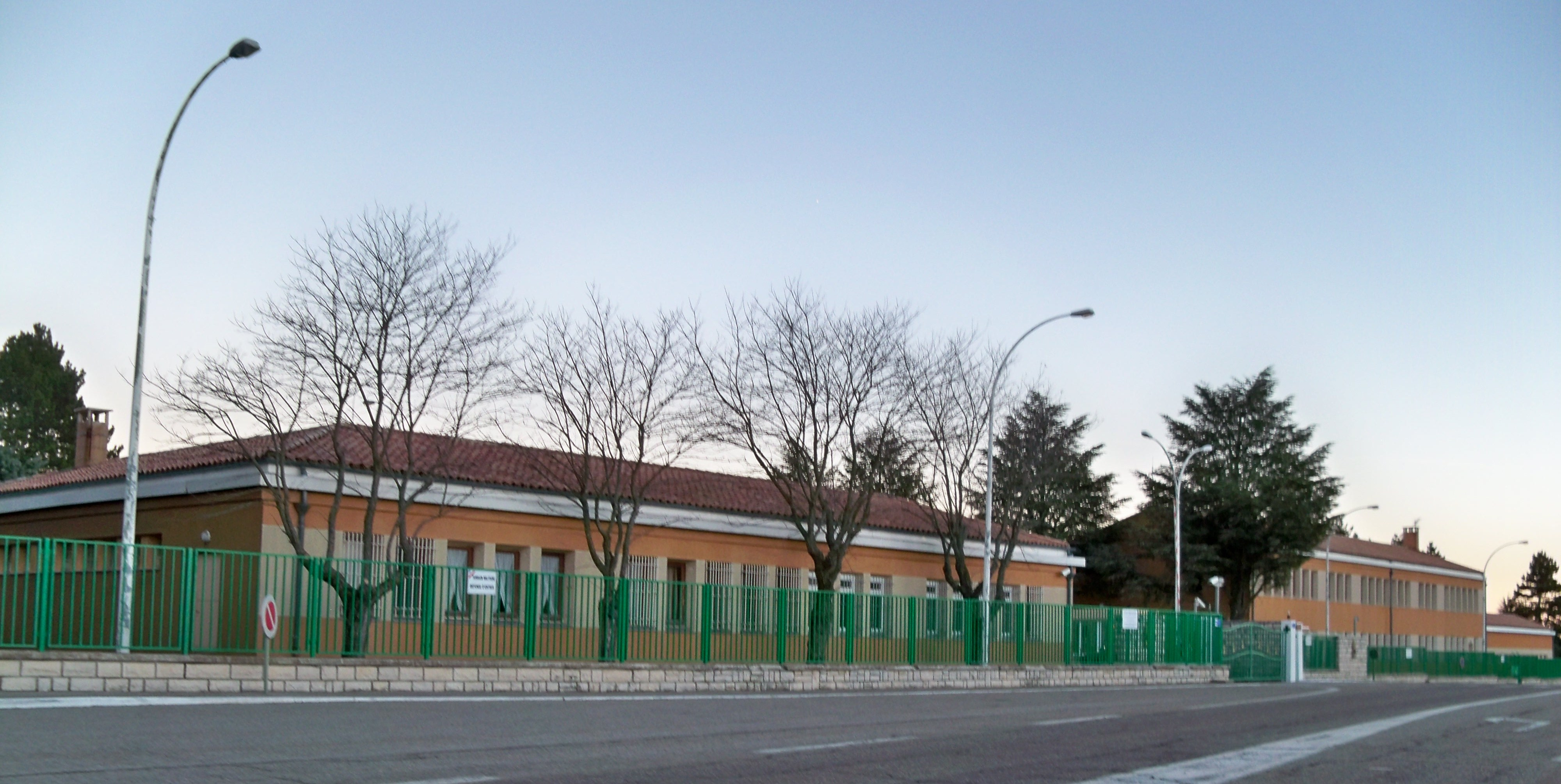
Part of the barracks, in 2010.

The base, renamed Maréchal Koenig Barracks, is home to the 2nd Foreign Engineer Regiment, the Saint-Christol Defense Base Support Group, and a listening station operated by the Directorate-General for External Security (DGSE).

A new medical facility was inaugurated in December 2023 after 14 months of construction.

The Saint-Christol airfield (ICAO code: LFXI) is a military airfield closed to public air traffic and unauthorized aircraft.

A decree of 31 January 2009 placed the airfield on List No. 2, designating it for use by state administrations.

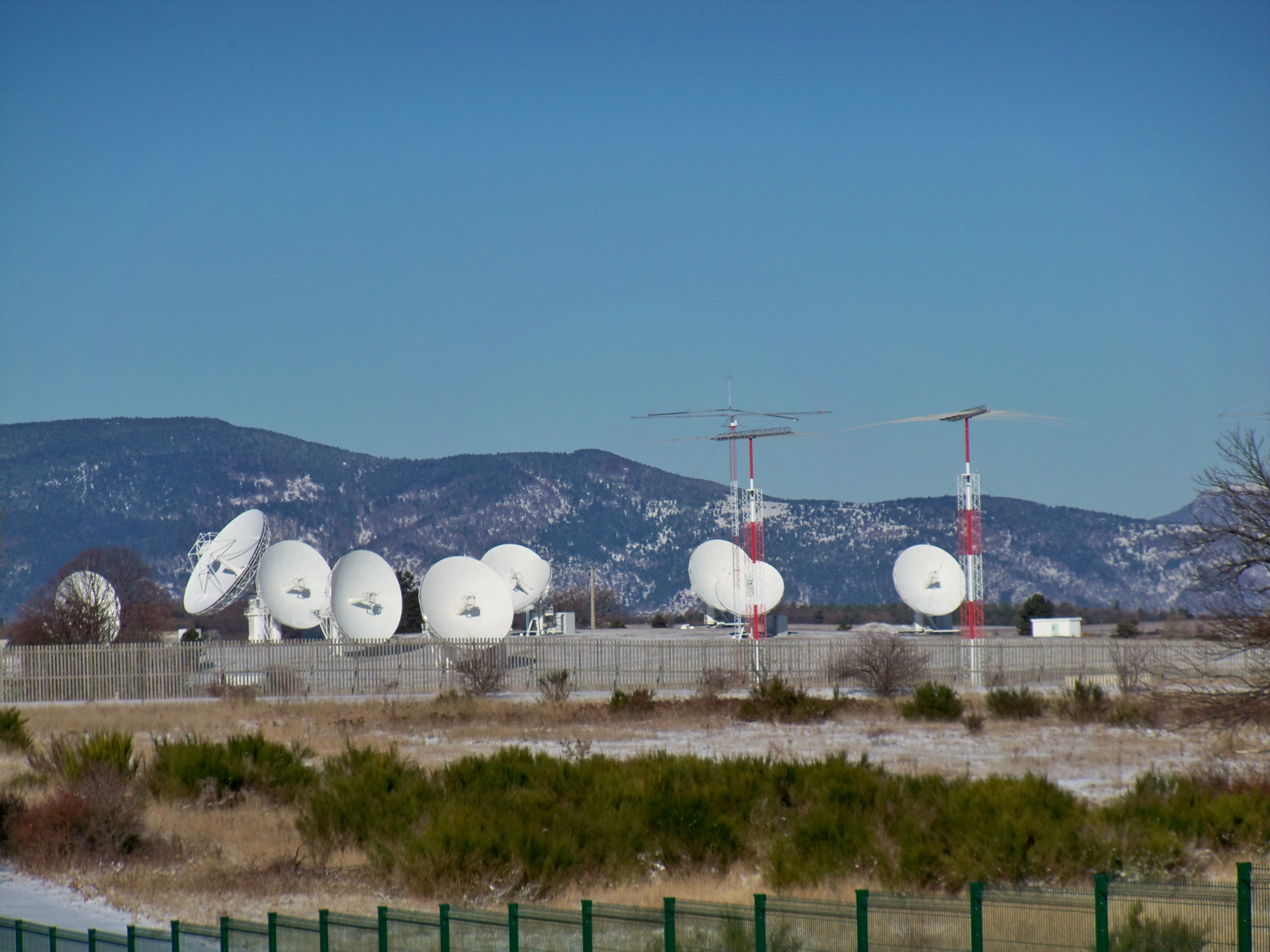
DGSE listening station.

Only the “NDB SCL” radio-navigation beacon remains at the airfield, which no longer provides air traffic control services. The airfield continues to fall under the jurisdiction of the Provence aeronautical district based at Marseille-Provence.

Two areas with special status are maintained: parachute drop zone 435, located 2 kilometers north of the runway, and restricted area R11, extending from ground level to 1,000 feet, established to protect the 2nd Foreign Engineer Regiment.

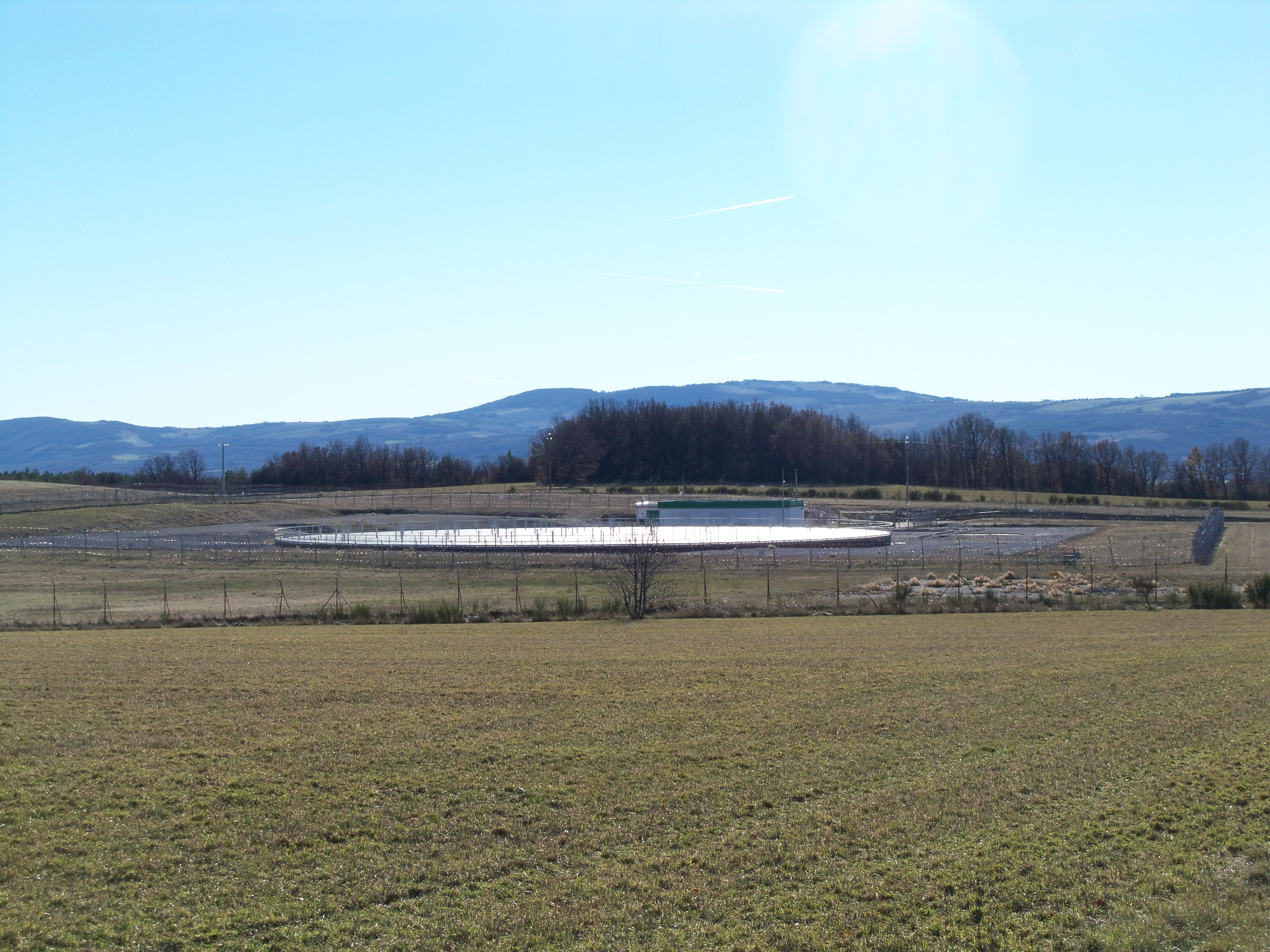
Reception site for the “Graves” radar, on the Albion plateau, in Revest-du-Bion.

The French aerospace laboratory ONERA installed the receiver of the “Graves” radar (Note: Graves is the acronym for “Grand réseau adapté à la veille spatiale” (Large Network Adapted to Space Surveillance).) on one of the launch zones. The radar was commissioned on 15 December 2005 to detect satellites. In 2007, it was the only operational satellite surveillance system in Western Europe, with comparable systems existing only in Russia and the United States.

The radar system is distinguished by having separate transmission and reception sites. The transmission site is located on the former Broyes-lès-Pesmes air base near Broye-Aubigney-Montseugny, while the reception site is situated on the Albion Plateau at Revest-du-Bion, approximately 400 km away. (Note: The coordinates of the transmission site are as follows: 47°20′05″N 5°30′51″E) The reception system uses Doppler detection, with signal-processing calculations performed by a dedicated real-time computer installed at Air Base 115 Orange-Caritat.

=== Scientific installations ===
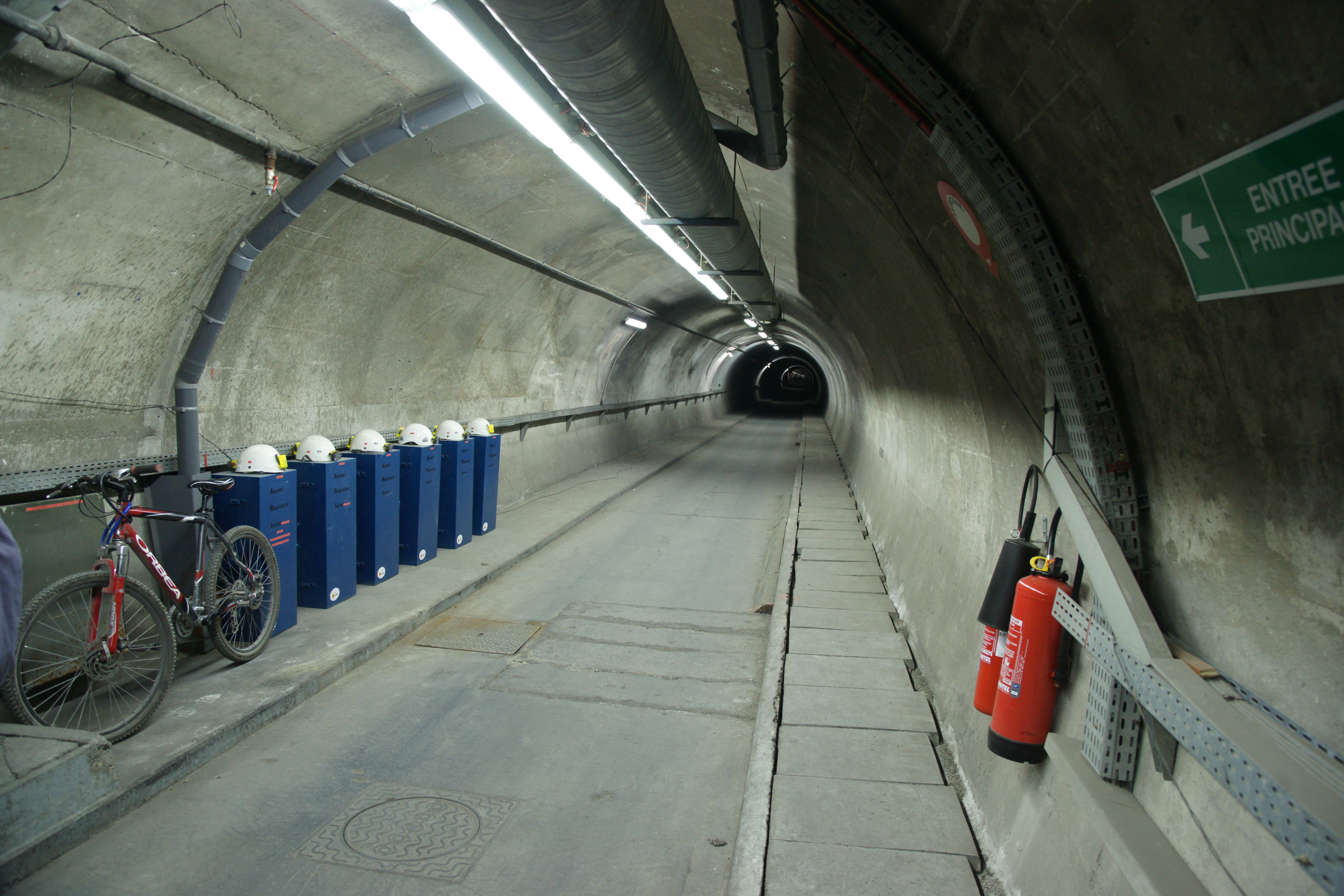
Low-noise underground laboratory tunnel.

Following the dismantling of the missiles, most of the silos were destroyed and abandoned.

One launch zone was preserved and converted into a public astronomical observatory, known as “Sirene,” while Fire Control Post No. 1 was repurposed as the Low-Noise Underground Laboratory, operated by the CNRS and Avignon University. The facility benefits from the isolation provided by the armored launch capsule.

=== Energy plant ===
The base includes a solar heating plant that supplies a hybrid solar-biomass district heating network serving residential buildings, shops, and a swimming pool. The system, provided by Helioclim, incorporates 750 m² of mirrors.

== See also ==
- 2nd Foreign Engineer Regiment
- Albion Plateau
- Force de dissuasion

== Bibliography ==
- Le Guelte, Georges (2009). Les Armes Nucléaires : Mythes et réalités [Nuclear Weapons: Myths and Realities] (in French). Arles: Actes Sud. ISBN 978-2-7427-8265-9.
- Griset, Pascal (2006). Georges Pompidou et la modernité : les tensions de l'innovation, 1962-1974 [Georges Pompidou and modernity: the tensions of innovation, 1962–1974] (in French). P.I.E Peter Lang. ISBN 978-90-5201-329-9.
- Heuser, Beatrice (1999). NATO, Britain, France and the FRG : Nuclear Strategies and Forces for Europe, 1949–2000. Springer. ISBN 978-0-230-37762-2.
