= 1st Strategic Missile Group (France) =

Former unit of the Strategic Air Forces of the French Air Force

1st Strategic Missiles Groupment
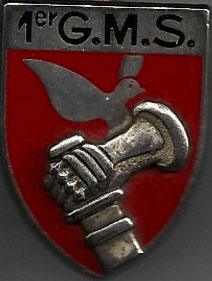
- Unit insignia
- Active: September 1968 – August 1998
- Country: France
- Branch: French Air and Space Force
- Type: Strategic nuclear missiles
- Role: Force de dissuasion (Nuclear deterrence)
- Part of: Strategic Air Forces
- Garrison/HQ: Air Base 200 Apt-Saint-Christol
- Equipment: IRBM S2 and S3

The 1st Strategic Missiles Groupment (French: 1^{er} Groupement de Missiles Stratégiques, 1^{er} GMS) is a former unit of the Strategic Air Forces of the French Air and Space Force.

== History ==
The 1st SMG was formed in September 1968 as the land component of the French nuclear triad (together with the Navy's Redoutable-class ballistic nuclear submarines and the Air Force's fleet of Dassault Mirage IV nuclear bombers). The 1st SMG was an army unit armed with 18 S2 strategic nuclear ballistic missiles. It was based on the Plateau d'Albion in the southeast of France. The group reached operational readiness with its S2 missiles on 2 August 1971. The 18 missiles were split in two batteries (of 9 silos each), officially called "firing units" (unités de tir), which were formed respectively in 1970 and in 1972. The first battery was taken off duty in April 1978 in anticipation of the replacement of the S2s with the new S3 ballistic missiles; the modernization of the infrastructure for fielding of the new system commenced at the end of that year. The battery received its first S3 missile on 23 May 1980 (three months behind schedule from the timetable set in 1973) and reached operational readiness on 1 June. The two batteries formed the Firing Squadron 01.200 "Luberon" (l'Escadron de Tir (ET) 01.200 "Luberon")—the operational unit of the French Army's Strategic Missile Brigade 05.200 (Brigade de Missiles Stratégiques (BMS) 05.200), formed in May 1968. The "Luberon" Firing Squadron changed its designation from 01.200 to 02.394 in 1981.

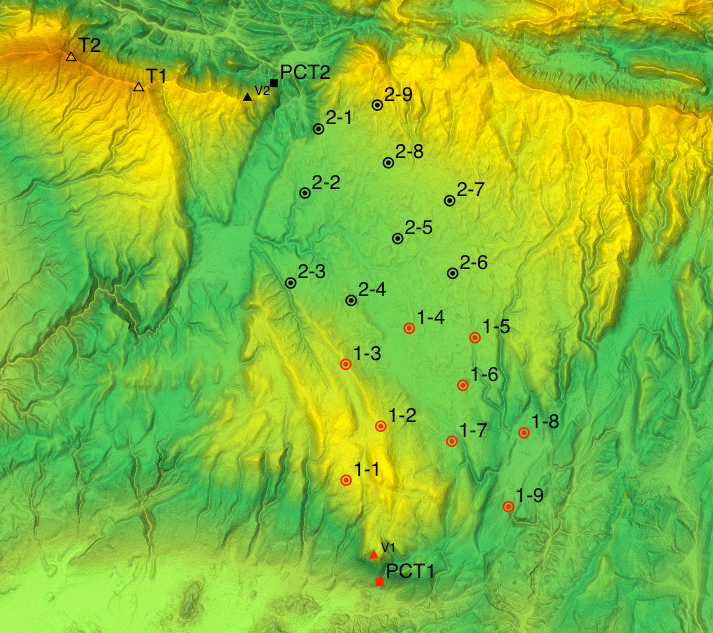
The location of the 1st Strategic Missile Groupment on the Plateau d'Albion with its two batteries (in red and black) and their respective missile silos (1-1 through 1-9 and 2-1 through 2-9), fire control sites (PCT1 and PCT2), telecommunications sites (T1 and T2) and the fire mission alert receivers (V1 and V2).

In 1985, the land-based ballistic missile component was transferred from the French Army to the French Air Force. Thus, in June that year, the Strategic Missile Brigade 05.200 became the 95th Strategic Missile Wing (95e Escadre de Missiles Stratégiques (EMS 00.095)), the Firing Squadron 02.394 "Luberon" became its Strategic Missile Squadron 01.095 (Escadron de Missile Stratégique (EMS) 01.095), and the army base became an operational air force installation designated as Air Base 200 Apt-Saint-Christol. The base was protected by the Protection Squadron 21.200 (l'Escadron de protection (EP) 21.200), a dedicated missile air defence unit armed with Crotale SAMs, a dedicated NBC defence unit and the 04.067 Durance Helicopter Squadron (l'Escadron d'hélicoptères (EH) 04.067 Durance) providing perimeter security to the base. Protection Squadron 21.200 consisted of four paratrooper companies and additional support units such as horse-mounted and working dog platoons. It was formed in 1968 and split into two separate squadrons in 1978.

With the armed forces reduction in Europe after the end of the Cold War and the rapid technological advancements in guided weapon systems, the base's vulnerability increased. As a result, plans for the replacement of the S3 with a land version of the Navy's M5 strategic nuclear ballistic missile system were deemed impractical by the French government. On 22 February 1996 French President Jacques Chirac announced that the S3 missiles would be dismantled and that the Apt-Saint-Christol air base would be closed.

On 31 August 1998 the 1st Strategic Missile Group and the 04.067 Durance Helicopter Squadron were disbanded. The dismantling of the S3 missiles was completed the following year.

== Bases ==
- Air Base 200 Apt-Saint-Christol

== Equipment ==
- S-2 IRBM
- S-3 IRBM

== See also ==
- List of Escadres of the French Air Force
