= TN 90 =

- Type: Nuclear weapon
- Place of origin: France

Production history
- Designed: 1983–1990
- Produced: 1990–1992
- No. built: 30

Specifications
- Blast yield: variable up to 80 kt (330 TJ)

The TN 90 was a variable yield thermonuclear warhead developed by France for the Hadès tactical missile, designed to replace the AN 51/Pluton system. Development began in 1983, and production in 1990. However, following the collapse of the Soviet Union, production was halted after only 30 of an intended 180 warheads were built, and they were immediately put into storage. The Hadès missiles, and their TN-90 warheads, were retired, along with all French land-based missiles, in 1996. By the end of 2000 the TN 90's were at CEA Valduc waiting to be disassembled.
