= Saint-Christol, Vaucluse =

Saint-Christol
- Commune
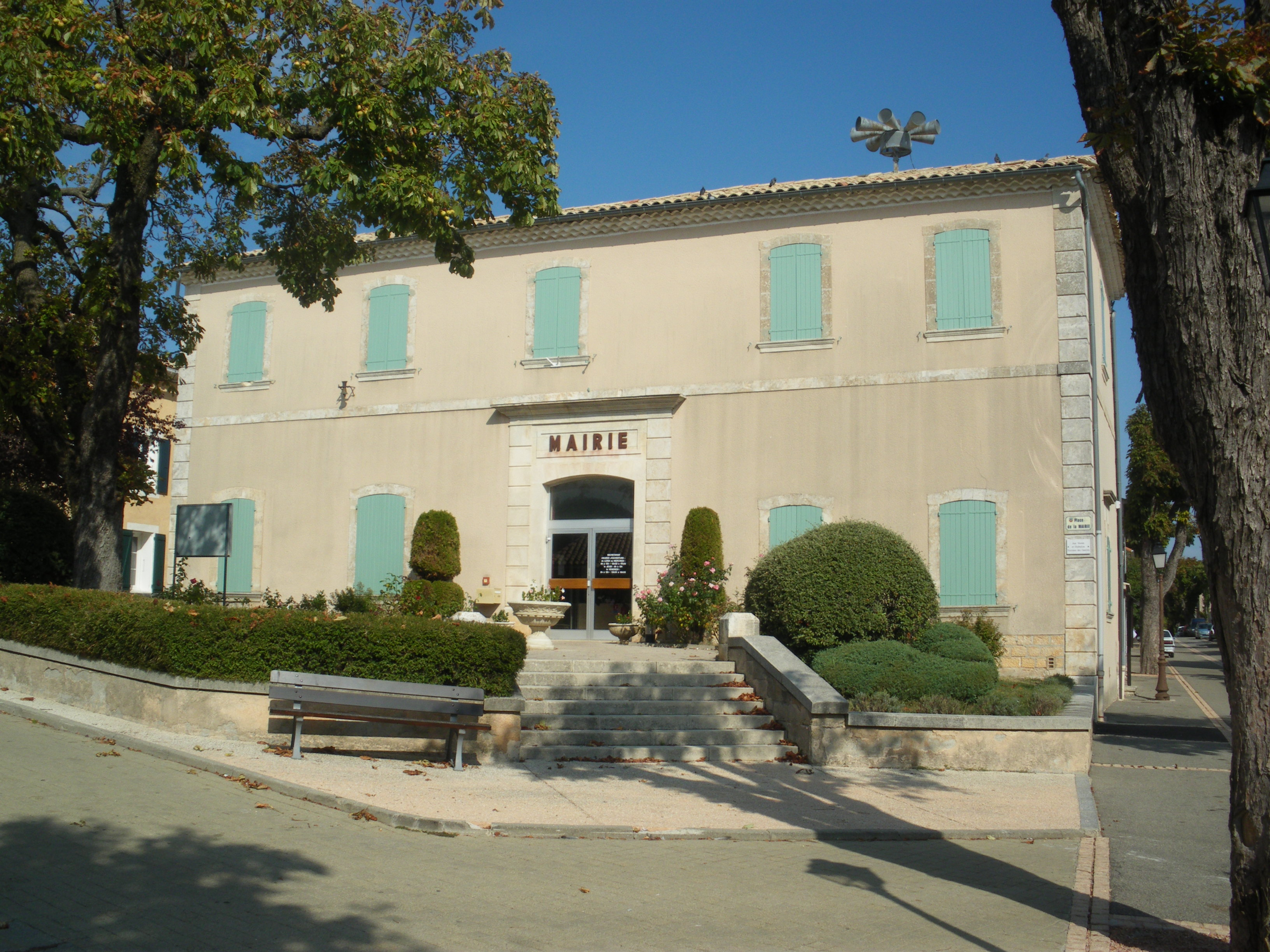
- Mairie

- Coat of arms
- Location of Saint-Christol
- Location within France Location within Provence-Alpes-Côte d'Azur
- Coordinates: 44°01′46″N 5°29′34″E
- Country: France
- Region: Provence-Alpes-Côte d'Azur
- Department: Vaucluse
- Arrondissement: Carpentras
- Canton: Pernes-les-Fontaines
- Intercommunality: Ventoux Sud

Government
  - Mayor (2020–2026): Henri Bonnefoy
- Area^{1}: 46.08 km^{2} (17.79 sq mi)
- Population (2023): 1,409
  - Density: 30.58/km^{2} (79.19/sq mi)
- Time zone: UTC+01:00 (CET)
  - Summer (DST): UTC+02:00 (CEST)
- INSEE/Postal code: 84107 /84390
- Website: saintchristol.free.fr
- ^{1} French Land Register data, which excludes lakes, ponds, glaciers > 1 km^{2} (0.386 sq mi or 247 acres) and river estuaries.

Saint-Christol (French pronunciation: [sɛ̃ kʁistɔl]; Occitan: Sant Cristòu) is a commune in the Vaucluse department in the Provence-Alpes-Côte d'Azur region in southeastern France.

== See also ==
- Communes of the Vaucluse department
- Air Base 200 Apt–Saint-Christol
