= TN 61 =

- Type: Nuclear weapon
- Place of origin: France

Service history
- In service: 1977-1991

Specifications
- Blast yield: 1-1.2 megatons

The TN 61 was a French thermonuclear warhead with a 1 to 1.2 megaton yield. It was a lighter version of the TN 60 which it replaced.

The TN 61 was in service from 1977 and 1991. It armed the M20 SLBM carried by the Redoutable-class SSBNs and the S3 IRBM.
