= Greece and weapons of mass destruction =

Greece does not possess weapons of mass destruction and is a party to several international treaties aimed at preventing their development, production, and proliferation. These include agreements related to nuclear, chemical, and biological weapons.

== Nuclear weapons ==
Greece does not have an independent nuclear weapons program and is a signatory to the Treaty on the Non-Proliferation of Nuclear Weapons (NPT), which it ratified in 1970. Under the treaty, Greece committed not to develop or acquire nuclear weapons and to allow international monitoring of its nuclear activities.

During the Cold War, Greece participated in the nuclear sharing arrangements of North Atlantic Treaty Organization (NATO). As part of these arrangements, the United States reportedly stored tactical nuclear weapons at bases in Greece, including the Araxos Air Base. These weapons remained under U.S. control and were intended for possible use by NATO forces in the event of a major conflict with the Soviet Union and its allies.

The nuclear weapons were withdrawn from Greece in 2001 as part of broader reductions in U.S. tactical nuclear deployments in Europe following the end of the Cold War.

== Chemical weapons ==
Greece is a state party to the Chemical Weapons Convention (CWC), which entered into force in 1997. The convention prohibits the development, production, acquisition, stockpiling, and use of chemical weapons and requires the destruction of existing stockpiles.

Greece has declared that it does not possess chemical weapons. Compliance with the convention is monitored by the Organisation for the Prohibition of Chemical Weapons (OPCW).

== Biological weapons ==
Greece is also a party to the Biological Weapons Convention (BWC), which prohibits the development, production, and stockpiling of biological and toxin weapons. The treaty entered into force in 1975, and Greece supports international efforts to prevent the spread of biological weapons.

== Policy and international commitments ==
As a member of NATO and the European Union, Greece supports international non-proliferation initiatives and export control regimes aimed at preventing the spread of weapons of mass destruction and related technologies.
