= Pluton (missile) =

French tactical ballistic missile

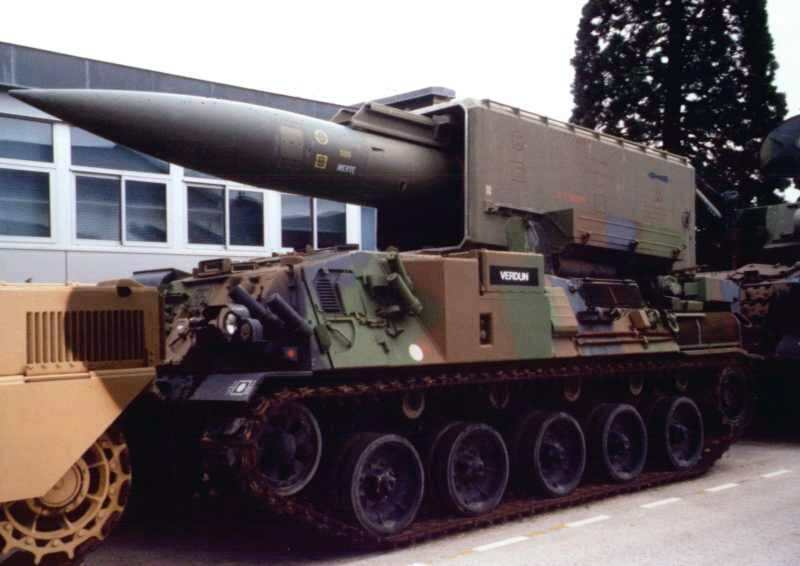
- Type: Tactical ballistic missile
- Place of origin: France

Service history
- In service: 1974 to 1993
- Used by: France

Production history
- Manufacturer: SNIAS

Specifications
- Mass: 2,423 kg (5,342 lb)
- Length: 7.64 m (25 ft 1 in)
- Diameter: 0.65 m (2 ft 2 in)
- Warhead: Nuclear 15 kt of TNT; Nuclear 25 kt of TNT; Conventional High-Explosive
- Engine: Single-stage solid
- Operational range: 120 km (75 mi)
- Maximum speed: 1,100 m/s (3,600 ft/s)
- Guidance system: Inertial
- Launch platform: TEL platform on an AMX-30 chassis

The Pluton missile was a French nuclear-armed tactical ballistic missile (short-range ballistic missile, SRBM) system launched from a transporter erector launcher (TEL) platform mounted on an AMX-30 tank chassis. It was designed to provide the tactical part of French nuclear deterrence during the Cold War.

== Development ==
The Pluton came in replacement of the U.S.-built Honest John missile. It had an operating range between 17 and 120 km (11 and 75 mi), with a CEP of 150 m. This short range only allowed strikes on targets in West Germany or within France itself, which led to the development of the longer ranged Hadès missile.

The system was relatively light-weight, which allowed its deployment in difficult conditions. A CT-20 drone was available to provide last-minute information about the target before launch, making the Pluton system battle-capable.

A project for an updated version, called Super-Pluton, was dropped in favour of the Hadès project, and the aging Pluton was gradually discarded until completely retired in 1993.

== Units ==
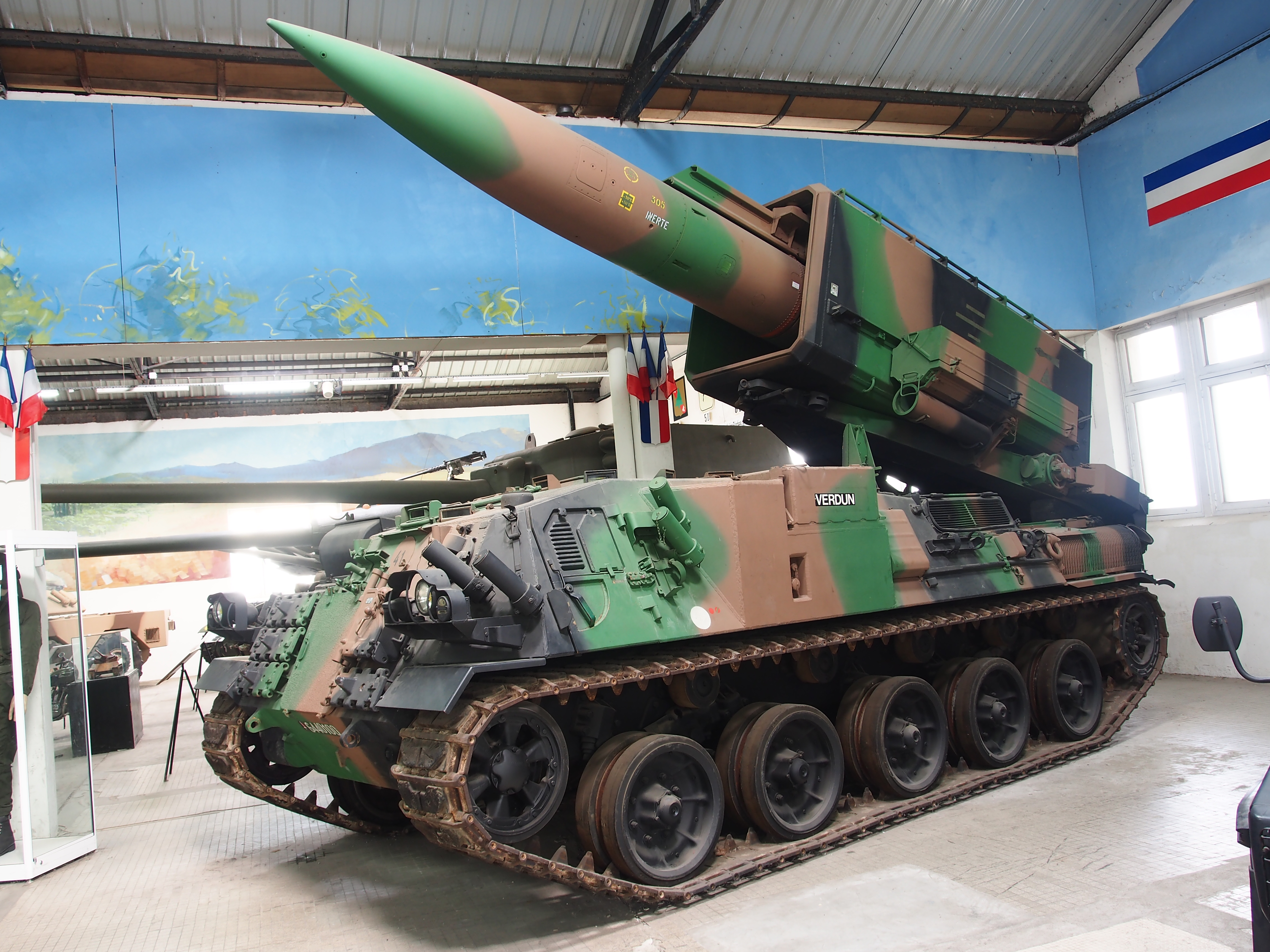
A 25kt tactical Pluton missile on its TEL at the Musée des blindés in Saumur.

The regiments and groups which used the equipment included:

- 1st Army Corps
  - 3rd Artillery Regiment (1970–1990)
  - 4th Artillery Regiment (1976–1980)
  - 15th Artillery Regiment (1974–1990)
- 2nd Army Corps
  - 32nd Artillery Regiment (1977–1993)
  - 74th Artillery Regiment (1975–1993)
- 3rd Army Corps
  - 3rd Artillery Regiment (1990–1993)
  - 4th Artillery Regiment (1980–1993)
- Nuclear support regiments included:
  - 21st Maintenance Battalion
  - 22nd Maintenance Battalion

== Operators ==
France

- French Army

== See also ==
- MGM-52 Lance – (United States)
