= CEA Valduc =

Coordinates: 47°34′56″N 4°52′14″E

CEA Valduc or the Valduc Centre for Nuclear Studies is a French nuclear facility, part of the Direction des applications militaires (DAM) of the French Atomic Energy Commission; dedicated to the study, manufacturing, maintenance and dismantling of nuclear weapons.

The site was acquired in 1957 by the CEA and the centre built in 1958. It has an area of 6.7 km^{2} (now 7.5 km^{2}), while the actual site occupies 1.8 km^{2}. Seventeen basic nuclear installations are on the site, comprising a total of 25,000 m^{2} of floor space. The centre is surrounded by a zone where photography and cartography are prohibited but through traffic is permitted on roads.

There are about 1,000 CEA employees working in the centre, as well as about 300 employees from contractors.

Since a restructuring decision of the CEA in 1996, Valduc has been the sole site responsible for military nuclear material. From 1980 to 1993, the French Air Force occupied a 0.4 km^{2} plot where it operated a plant for the assembly of nuclear warheads for air and land-based missiles (ASMP and Hadès).

A proportion of the locals consider that Valduc does not bring benefits to the area but imposes constraints and discourages people from coming to the area. This is partly because most employees commute from far away and the centre does not pay local taxes to the local commune (because it is a public research establishment). However, the commune government asserts that some of the activities at CEA/Valduc are taxable. In 2003, Valduc was considered partially taxable, a move which the CEA contested.(CEA, Financial report 2003). The Dijon administrative court considered that activities related to the military were not taxable but those pertaining to general technology development and consulting for private industry were taxable.

== See also ==
- Pantex
