= Hadès =

French short-range ballistic missile

HADES
- Type: Short-range ballistic missile (SRBM)
- Place of origin: France

Service history
- In service: 1991 (terminated in 1996)

Production history
- Manufacturer: Aerospatiale (Now EADS)

Specifications
- Mass: 1,850 kg
- Length: 7.50 m
- Diameter: 0.53 m
- Warhead: Single TN-90 with a variable yield up to 80 kt of TNT nuclear warhead High explosives conventional warhead
- Engine: Single-stage solid
- Operational range: 480 km
- Guidance system: Inertial guidance system Digital terminal guidance (GPS); DSMAC TV digital scene matching
- Launch platform: wheeled platforms composed of a tractor and a trailer with two missiles

The Hadès system was a short-range ballistic pre-strategic nuclear weapon system designed by France as a last warning before the use of strategic nuclear weapons in a prospective Soviet invasion of Western Europe. It was designed from July 1984 as a replacement for the tactical road-mobile Pluton missile. Initially 120 missiles were planned to be deployed.

A wheeled trailer and launcher, each carrying two missiles in containers, was planned for deploying the Hadès. The original design had a range of 350 km, which was later increased to 450 km. The guidance system was an inertial platform which could be programmed to execute evasive maneuvers before hitting the target. A version designed to hit hardened underground targets also had a final guidance system which used a GPS-based digital system, resulting in a Circular Error Probable of only 5 m, compared to a CEP of 100 m for the standard version.

== Development ==
Hadès began with project definition in 1975 as a replacement for the Pluton system. Development started in July 1984, and flight testing started in 1988. The Hadès program planned to build 120 missiles, some with nuclear and some with HE warheads. Hadès was originally designed with a range of 350 km, that would enable it to reach East Germany and Czechoslovakia if deployed from within France. The range requirement was later increased to 450 km. The missile was carried horizontally, erected by the truck itself, and launched immediately. The light weight of the missile made it easy to deploy even on difficult zones, and its great range made it usable for limited strategic aims, though not to destroy Soviet cities and missile silos. In 1991, due to the changing situation in Europe and to the German opposition to the program (which was openly designed to strike East Germany), restrictions were decided upon so as not to deploy the system and limit the complement to 15 mobile launching platforms and 30 missiles.

The system entered service in 1992, as a resource kept in storage in case of a serious national threat, in north-eastern France near Lunéville. Reports in 1993 suggested that a reversion to the 250 km range missile, but with a hard target HE penetration warhead and a GPS mid-course updating of the inertial navigation system, would provide an accurate and difficult-to-counter offensive weapon. A TV digital scene matching terminal guidance system has also been proposed, providing a CEP down to less than 5m.

=== Deployment ===
Hadès was designed for transportation on wheeled TELs, with tractor and trailer, each trailer carrying two missiles in containers that also act as launch boxes. The missile is reported to be 7.5m long, with a body diameter of 0.53m and a launch weight of about 1850 kg.

Reports suggest that the Hadès trajectory is kept low, so that the aerodynamic control fins at the rear of the missile can alter the trajectory and range during flight as well as making evasive maneuvers during the terminal phase near the target.

=== Payload ===
The missiles would be capable of carrying either the nuclear TN 90 or conventional HE warheads, the former probably having a yield of 80 kt.

== Implementation ==
The program completed development in 1992, with the first flight test taking place in 1988. It was planned that Hadès would enter service in 1992, and that only 30 missiles on 15 TEL vehicles would be built instead of the original plan to build 120 missiles. In 1991 the French Government announced that the Hadès missiles would not be deployed, but kept in storage, and the programme was terminated in 1992. However, 20 to 25 missiles were available in a national emergency with their mobile TEL vehicles, and were all located at Lunéville.

== Decommissioning ==
On 23 February 1996 the announcement by Jacques Chirac, the President of France, on the new format for French nuclear forces called for dismantling of Hadès missiles. On 23 June 1997 the last of the Hadès missiles was destroyed.
