= Bruno Barrillot =

French whistleblower (1940–2017)

Bruno Barrillot (9 April 1940 — 25 March 2017) was a French whistleblower and anti-nuclear activist, specialized in monitoring nuclear weapons and nuclear power. He wrote several works on the consequences of nuclear testing in the Algerian Sahara and French Polynesia. He was co-founder of the Armaments Observatory in 1984. He was also co-founder of AVEN (Association of Nuclear Test Veterans) on 9 June 2001.

== Biography ==
Barrillot was born in Lyon in France. He studied philosophy and theology at the Catholic University of Lyon, before becoming a Catholic priest and chaplain of the rural Christian youth movement in the diocese of Lyon from 1972 to 1985. In 1979 he and another priest, Léon Desbos, were prosecuted for the return of their military records in order to support a conscientious objector on trial and the local people in the Fight for the Larzac. They were sentenced to a suspended fine of 500 francs. He broke with the French Catholic Church in the mid-1980s, believing that its institutional positions over the NATO Double-Track Decision were "too timid". However, he remained close to the Archbishop of Lyon, for whom he followed the files of the pacifist movements. He then worked as a journalist for Libération until 1989.

In 1984, with Patrice Bouveret and Jean-Luc Thierry, Greenpeace-France permanent representative for nuclear testing, he founded the Center for Documentation and Research on Peace and Conflict (CDRPC), which he directed from 1985 to 2005, and which became the Arms Observatory in 2008.

Following the Sinking of the Rainbow Warrior by the French government, in 1990 he visited Mangareva in the Gambier Islands, which exposed to radioactive fallout due to the French military's nuclear tests at Moruroa and Fangataufa. The French government refused to recognise the health impact of nuclear testing until the passage of the Morin Law in 2010. At the time, "no cancer or leukemia register was then kept and the archives of local hospitals were repatriated to France where they are not accessible". On his return to France, he received various support, notably from John Doom, director of the Pacific office of the World Council of Churches, Madeleen Helmer and the Polynesian pastor Taarii Maraea.

Barrillot became a delegate for monitoring the consequences of nuclear tests to the Polynesian government. Dismissed during Gaston Flosse's return to power, he became assistant to Senator Richard Tuheiava (2013-2014). He was recalled to the post of delegate in 2016 by Édouard Fritch. He called into question "the cleanliness of the 193 French nuclear tests carried out in the Pacific between 1960 and 1996". While Marcel Jurien de la Gravière, then delegate for nuclear safety at Defense, recognized that six of these tests had "more significantly affected some islands and atolls", leading to fallout on inhabited areas, Barrillot estimated that "at least five archipelagos were affected", notably the Gambier archipelago located 400 km downwind. Furthermore, he estimated that "the underwater reliefs of the northwest of the atoll are very weakened" by 3000 tonnes of radioactive waste and military equipment submerged off the coast of Mururoa as well as from residues from 147 underground tests. He advised civilian and military victims in France, French Polynesia and Algeria to come together to express their demands.

Barrillot died a year after his return to Tahiti.
