= MR 31 =

- Type: Nuclear weapon
- Place of origin: France

Service history
- In service: 1970-1980

Specifications
- Blast yield: 120 kilotons

The MR 31 was a French nuclear warhead for the S2 medium-range ballistic missile.

The weapon had a yield of 120 kilotonnes of TNT (0.50 PJ) and weighed 700 kilograms (1,500 lb). It was apparently a pure plutonium device and unboosted, and the largest pure plutonium weapon ever built.

Entering service in August 1970 it was withdrawn from service by June 1980.

== See also ==
- force de frappe
- FOST
- nuclear tests by France
