= S2 (missile) =

Medium-range ballistic missile

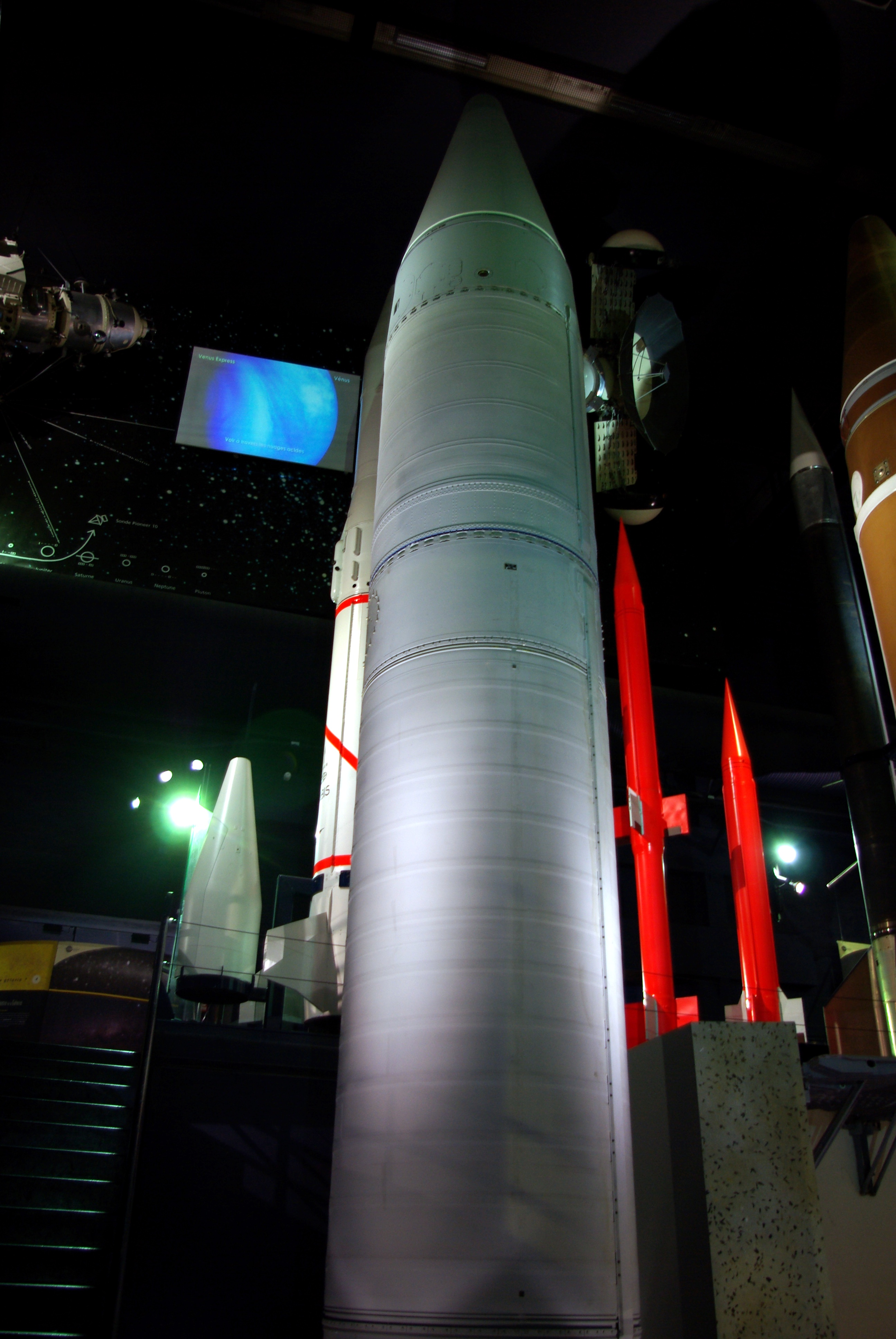
- S2 SSBS displayed at the Musée de l'Air et de l'Espace at Le Bourget.
- Type: MRBM
- Place of origin: France

Service history
- In service: 1971-1984
- Used by: French Air Force

Production history
- Manufacturer: Aérospatiale

Specifications
- Mass: 31,900 kg (70,300 lb)
- Length: 14.8 m (49 ft)
- Diameter: 1.5 m (4 ft 11 in)
- Warhead: 1 × MR 31 nuclear warhead, 120 kilotonnes
- Engine: Two-stage Solid-fuel rocket 534 kN (120,000 lb_{f})
- Operational range: 3,000 km (1,900 mi)
- Guidance system: Inertial
- Launch platform: Silo, Plateau d'Albion

The S2 was the first deployed French land-based strategic missile, equipped with a single nuclear warhead of 120 kilotonnes. In French it is called a Sol-Sol Balistique Stratégique, (SSBS or "ground-ground strategic ballistic missile"). The S2 was a two-stage, solid-propellant medium-range ballistic missile (MRBM).

== Operational history ==
Deployed in 1971, the main land-based component of the French nuclear deterrent (force de dissuasion) was the S2 missile, rounding out their strategic nuclear triad along with air and submarine assets. Two groups totalling 18 S2 missile silos were deployed at Apt-Saint-Christol airbase, on the Plateau d'Albion in the Vaucluse region.

The S2 was replaced by the S3 SSBS in the early 1980s.

== See also ==
- Nuclear proliferation
- France and weapons of mass destruction
- Force de dissuasion, defunct French nuclear triad
