= S3 (missile) =

Intermediate-range ballistic missile

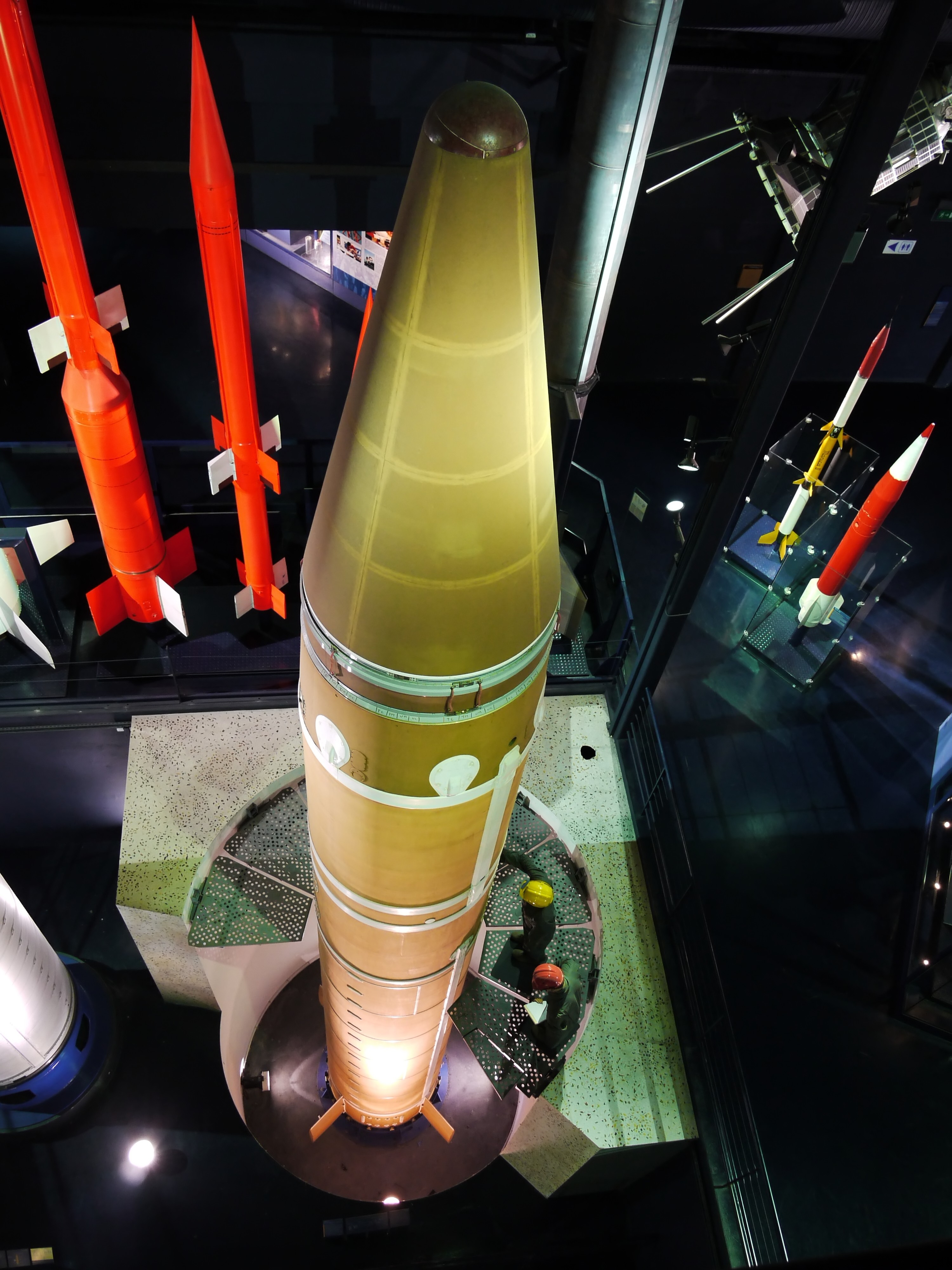
- S3 missile on display at Musée de l'air et de l'espace
- Type: IRBM
- Place of origin: France

Service history
- In service: 1980-1996
- Used by: French Air Force

Production history
- Manufacturer: Aérospatiale

Specifications
- Mass: 25,800 kg (56,900 lb)
- Length: 13.8 m (45 ft)
- Diameter: 1.5 m (4 ft 11 in)
- Warhead: TN 61 warhead, 1.2 megatonnes
- Engine: Two-stage Solid-fuel rocket 534 kN (120,000 lb_{f})
- Propellant: 23,000 kg (51,000 lb) solid fuel
- Operational range: 3,500 km (2,200 mi)
- Guidance system: Inertial
- Launch platform: Missile silo, Plateau d'Albion

The S3 was a French land-based intermediate-range ballistic missile, equipped with a single 1.2-megatonne thermonuclear warhead. In France it is called an SSBS, for Sol-Sol Balistique Stratégique, or Ground-Ground Strategic Ballistic Missile.

== Design ==
The S3 is a two-stage, solid-propellant intermediate-range ballistic missile (IRBM). The first stage was inherited from the S2, with a P16 solid fuel engine and 4 exhausts.

The first stage carries 16,940 kg (37,350 lb) of fuel and burns for 72 seconds. The second stage carries 6,015 kg (13,261 lb) and burns for 58 seconds. The nuclear warhead, a single 1.2 Mt TN 61, is hardened and carries penetration aids.

== Operational history ==
From 1971, the main land-based component of the French nuclear deterrent (force de dissuasion) was the S2 missile. In 1973, a programme was started to develop a second-generation "ground-ground ballistic strategic" (SSBS in French) missile, completed in 1980. Two groups totaling 18 S2 missile silos were upgraded to the S3 standard.

A first 9-missile group was deployed at Apt-Saint-Christol air base, on the Plateau d'Albion in the Vaucluse region, entering service in 1982. The second group followed soon after. 40 missiles were built, 13 being used on trials.

The S3 were originally planned to be replaced around 2005 by a land-based version of the M5, the submarine missile planned at the time. As the M5 project was itself delayed and eventually cancelled in favour of the M51, in 1994, the replacement was rescheduled to be a land-based version of the M45. The 18 S3D missile silos were deactivated in September 1996, and within two years and after an expenditure of US$77.5 million, the silos and related facilities were fully dismantled. They would not be replaced.
