= Hirhafek =

- Village
- Location within Algeria
- Coordinates: 23°39′10″N 5°45′53″E
- Country: Algeria
- Province: Tamanrasset Province
- District: Tazrouk District
- Commune: Idlès
- Elevation: 1,475 m (4,839 ft)
- Time zone: UTC+1 (CET)

Hirhafek (also written Hirafok, Hirhafok or Highafok) is a village in the commune of Idlès, in Tazrouk District, Tamanrasset Province, Algeria. It is located on the southern side of the N55 national highway between In Amguel to the west and Idlès to the east. The village is 26 kilometres (16 mi) southwest of Idlès and 98 kilometres (61 mi) north of Tamanrasset.
