= Mertoutek =

- Village
- Location within Algeria
- Coordinates: 24°13′41″N 5°32′24″E
- Country: Algeria
- Province: Tamanrasset Province
- District: Tamanrasset District
- Commune: Idlès
- Elevation: 1,358 m (4,455 ft)
- Time zone: UTC+1 (CET)

Mertoutek is a village in the commune of Idlès, in Tazrouk District, Tamanrasset Province, Algeria. It lies in the northern Hoggar Mountains on the eastern side of a wadi, 61 kilometres (38 mi) northwest of the town of Idlès and 158 kilometres (98 mi) north of Tamanrasset.

== Archaeology ==
During the Holocene, a group of people resided in Bas Mertoutek, where rock art is also found. Round Head rock art has not been found at Bas Mertoutek thus far. Among the many antennae stone structures in the region, there are antennae stone structures in Mertoutek. Djef Amane, which is near the village of Mertoutek, also has antennae stone structures, and Tan Ainesnis has a few bazinas. Opposite antennae stone structures are located in Mertoutek Djef Amane. At the center of one of the large stone structures, which has two opposite antennae stone structures, there is a tumulus; the tumulus has rock slabs that contain human remains. Tan Ainesnis is a prehistoric archaeological site, which is surrounded by funerary stone structures and rock art, and is near Wadi Mertoutek. Periodically, water pours down from the mountaintops and forms an oasis at Mertoutek. There is also a basin at Mertoutek. At Tan Ainesnis, there is Bovidian rock art, which includes a red-colored oxen and two engraved oxen facing one another; the oxen on the left had Tifinagh nearby. One of the earliest Libyco-Berber inscriptions in Africa are found in Wadi Mertoutek, near or within a petroglyph, which may be the depiction of a bovid, and may be associated with a pastoral community during a period of pastoralism.
