= Amsel =

Amsel may refer to:

- Amsel (surname)
- Amsel, Algeria, a village in Tamanrasset Province, Algeria

== See also ==
- Amschel
