= Arak, Algeria =

Arak
- Village
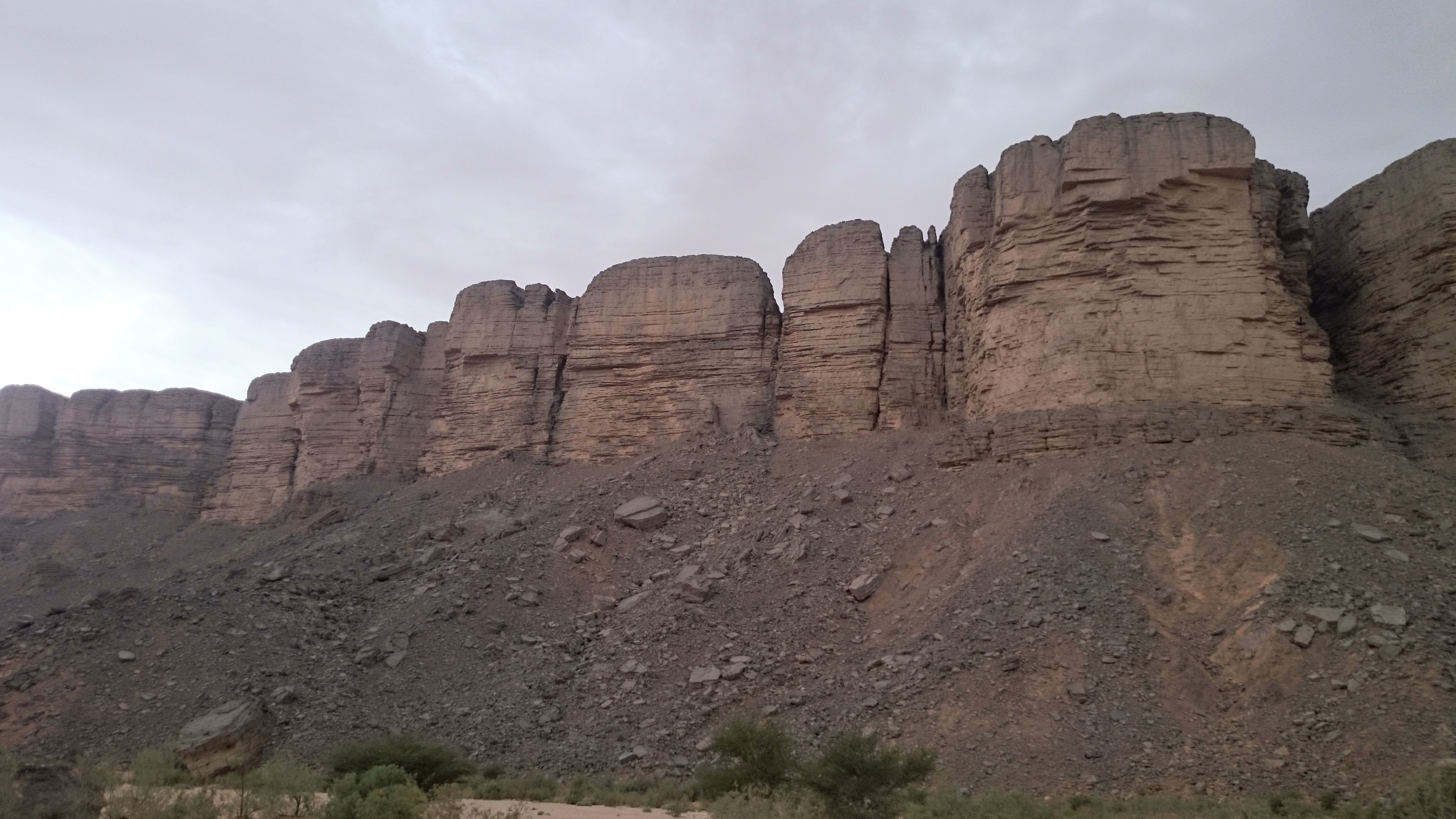

- Location within Algeria
- Coordinates: 25°16′0″N 3°43′54″E
- Country: Algeria
- Province: Tamanrasset Province
- District: Tamanrasset District
- Commune: In Amguel
- Elevation: 550 m (1,800 ft)
- Time zone: UTC+1 (CET)

Arak is a village in the commune of In Amguel, in Tamanrasset District, Tamanrasset Province, Algeria. It is located on the N1 national highway about halfway between In Salah and Tamanrasset, near the Arak gorges.

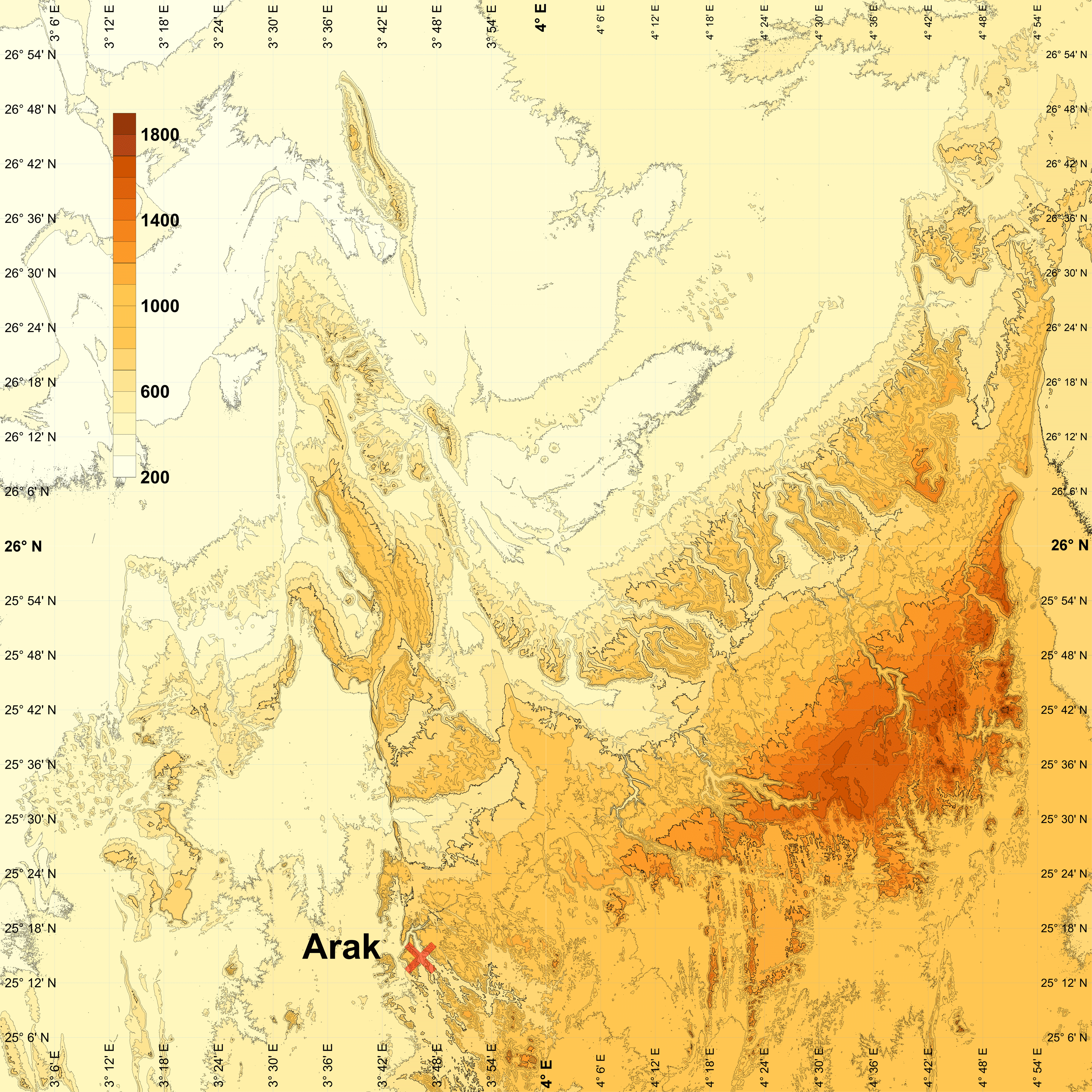
Topographic map of the region surrounding Arak

== Gallery ==
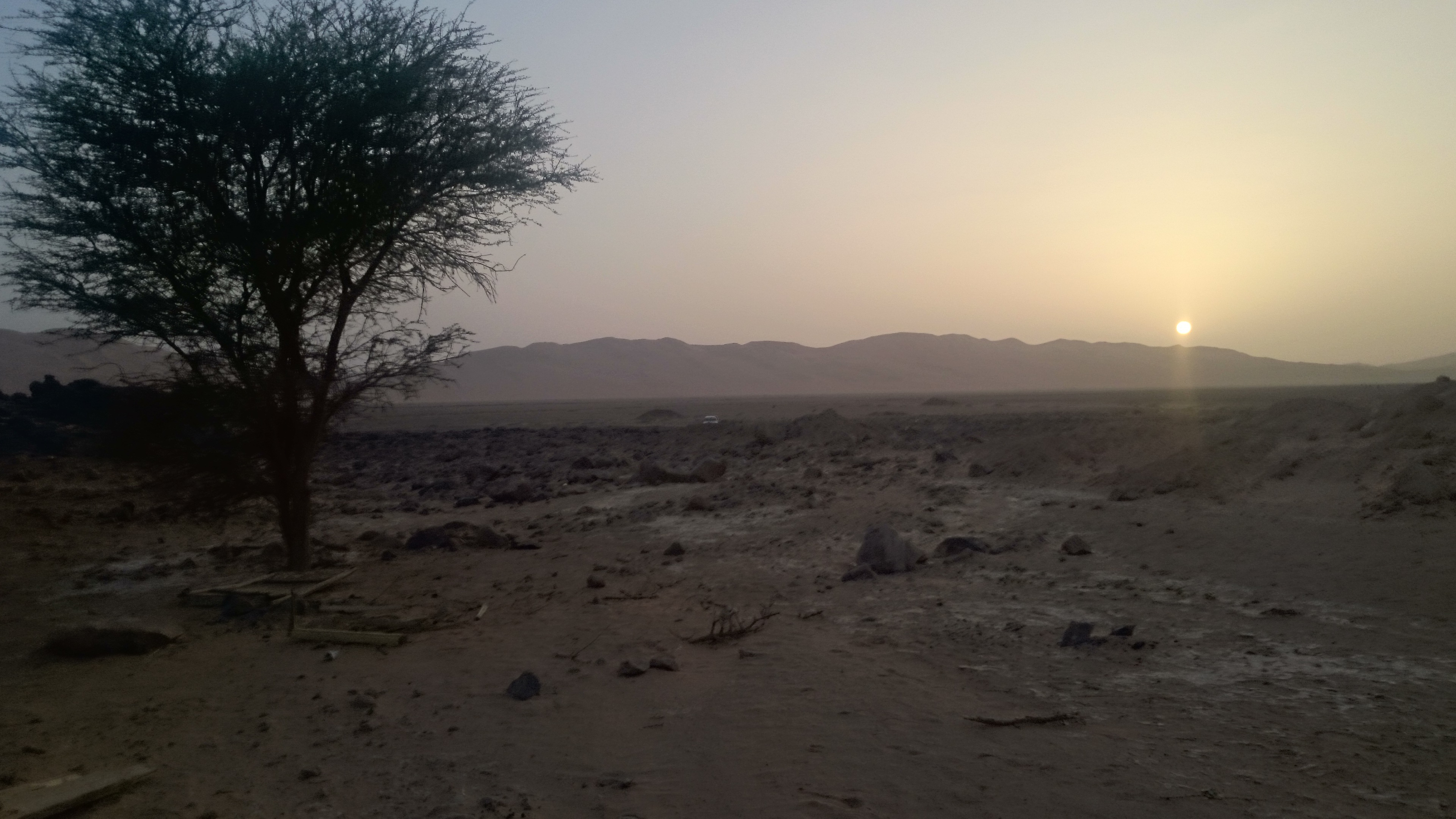
Arak, tamanrasset

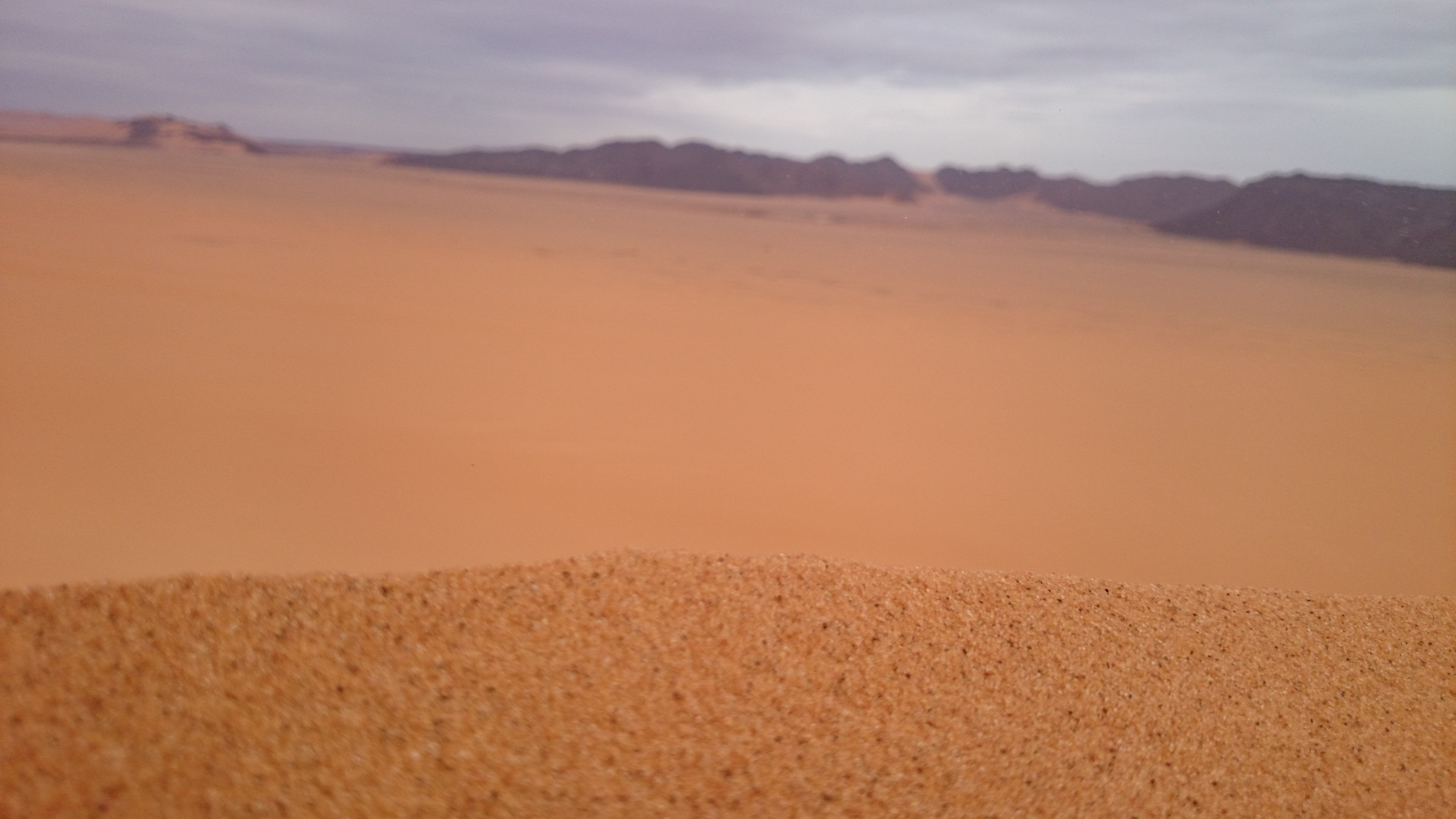
