= Amguid =

- Village
- Location within Algeria
- Coordinates: 26°25′20″N 5°21′45″E
- Country: Algeria
- Province: Tamanrasset Province
- District: Tazrouk District
- Commune: Idlès
- Elevation: 600 m (2,000 ft)
- Time zone: UTC+1 (CET)

Amguid is a village in the commune of Idlès, in Tazrouk District, Tamanrasset Province, Algeria. It is located in the remote north-eastern part of the province, about 400 kilometres (250 mi) north of Tamanrasset and 310 kilometres (190 mi) west of Illizi.

== Climate ==
Amguid has a hot desert climate (Köppen climate classification BWh), with very hot summers and mild winters, and very little precipitation throughout the year.

== Amguid crater ==
The Village of Amguid is the namesake for the nearby Amguid crater. The Amguid crater is considered one of the best preserved impact craters. It is also one of the most inaccessible.

Climate data for Amguid
Month	Jan	Feb	Mar	Apr	May	Jun	Jul	Aug	Sep	Oct	Nov	Dec	Year
Mean daily maximum °C (°F)	20.1 (68.2)	23.4 (74.1)	27.4 (81.3)	32.2 (90.0)	36.1 (97.0)	40.8 (105.4)	42.2 (108.0)	41.1 (106.0)	38.5 (101.3)	33.3 (91.9)	27.0 (80.6)	21.8 (71.2)	32.0 (89.6)
Daily mean °C (°F)	12.3 (54.1)	15.3 (59.5)	19.2 (66.6)	23.9 (75.0)	28.2 (82.8)	33.0 (91.4)	34.2 (93.6)	33.3 (91.9)	30.9 (87.6)	25.5 (77.9)	19.1 (66.4)	14.0 (57.2)	24.1 (75.3)
Mean daily minimum °C (°F)	4.6 (40.3)	7.2 (45.0)	11.0 (51.8)	15.7 (60.3)	20.4 (68.7)	25.3 (77.5)	26.2 (79.2)	25.6 (78.1)	23.3 (73.9)	17.8 (64.0)	11.3 (52.3)	6.3 (43.3)	16.2 (61.2)
Average precipitation mm (inches)	3 (0.1)	1 (0.0)	2 (0.1)	2 (0.1)	1 (0.0)	1 (0.0)	0 (0)	1 (0.0)	1 (0.0)	1 (0.0)	2 (0.1)	4 (0.2)	19 (0.6)
Source: climate-data.org
