= Idlès =

Municipality in Tamanrasset Province, Algeria

Idlès إدلس
- Commune and town
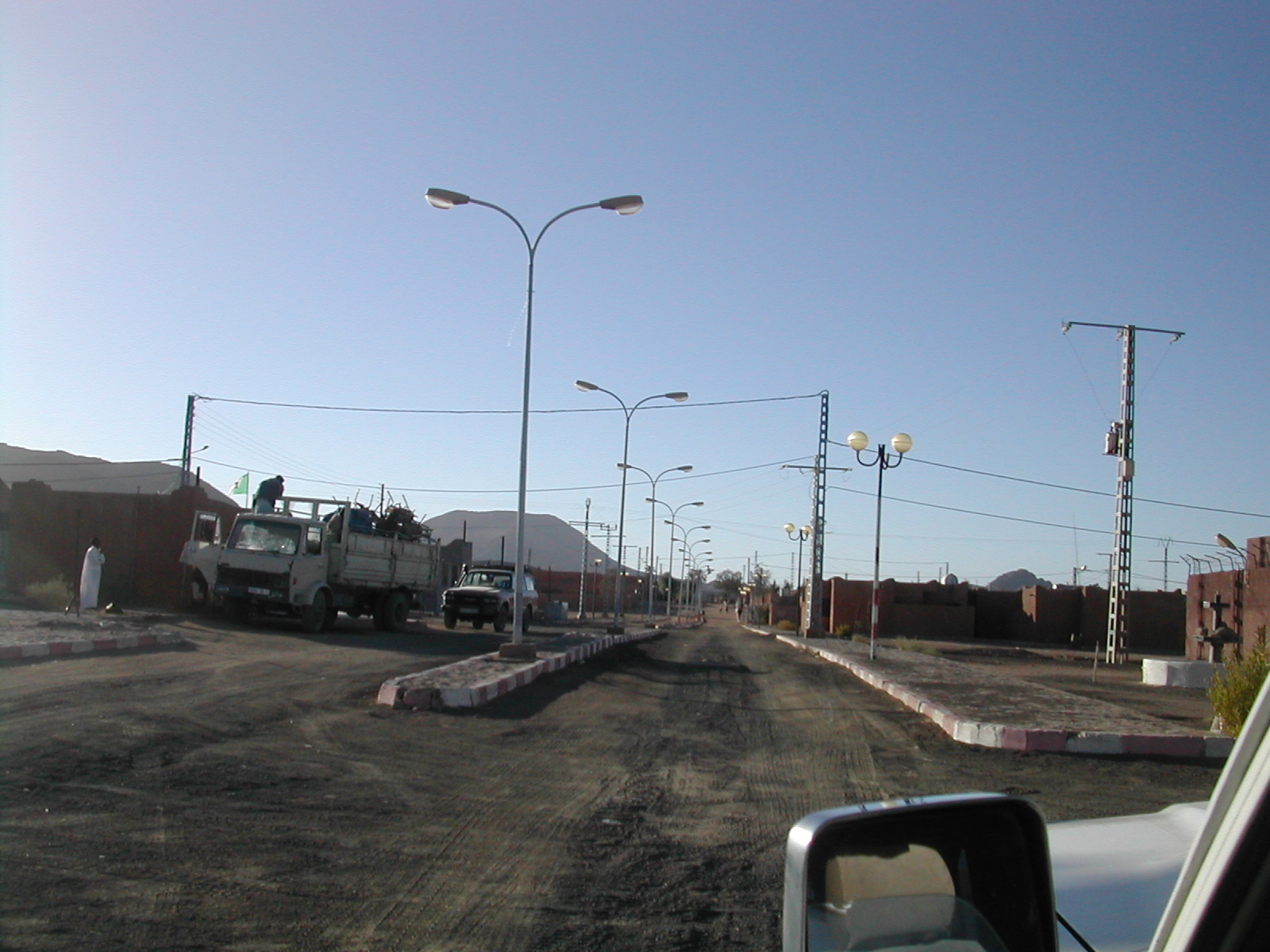
- A road in Idlès

- Location of Idlès commune within Tamanrasset Province

- Location of Idlès within Algeria
- Coordinates: 23°49′13″N 5°56′11″E
- Country: Algeria
- Province: Tamanrasset
- District: Tazrouk

Government
  - PMA Seats: 7

Area
  - Total: 58,330 km^{2} (22,520 sq mi)
- Elevation: 1,399 m (4,590 ft)

Population (2008)
  - Total: 4,945
  - Density: 0.08478/km^{2} (0.2196/sq mi)
- Time zone: UTC+01 (CET)
- Postal code: 11110
- ONS code: 1106

Idlès (Arabic: إدلس) is a municipality in Tazrouk District, Tamanrasset Province, Algeria. According to the 2008 census it has a population of 4,945, up from 3,791 in 1998, with an annual growth rate of 2.7%. Its postal code is 11110 and its municipal code is 1105. The largest nearby city is Tamanrasset; other smaller towns include In Amguel to the west and Tazrouk to the south.

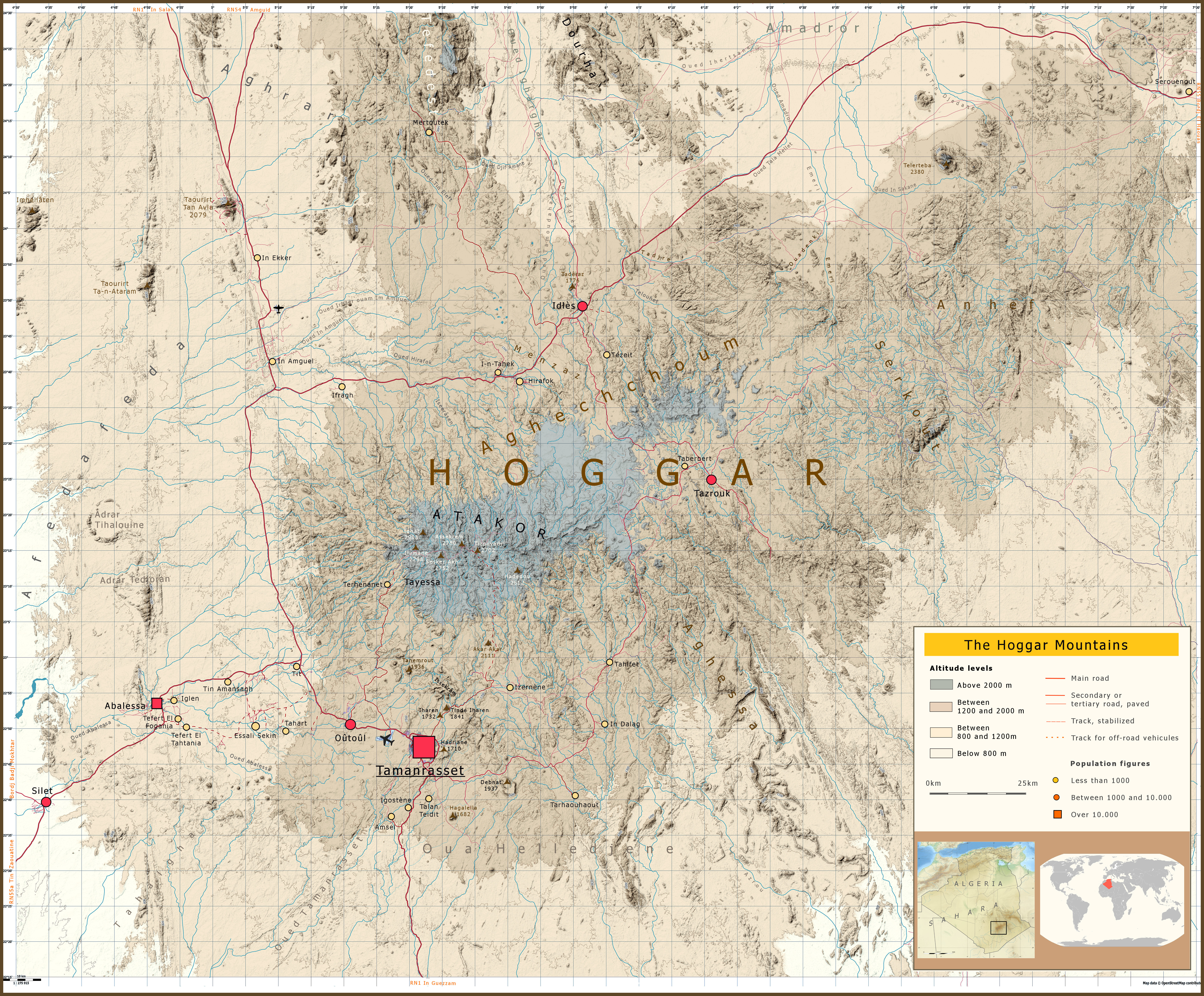
Map with Idlès on the northern edge of the Hoggar Mountains

== Geography ==
Idlès is located at an elevation of 1,399 metres (4,590 ft) in the Hoggar Mountains of southern Algeria. The town lies on the eastern bank of the Oued Tarouda. The surrounding area belongs to the West Saharan montane xeric woodlands ecoregion.

== Climate ==
Idlès has a hot desert climate (Köppen climate classification BWh), with very hot summers and mild winters, and very little precipitation throughout the year. Compared to other towns in the Sahara of southern Algeria its summers are less hot and it receives somewhat more precipitation due to its altitude.

Climate data for Idlès
Month	Jan	Feb	Mar	Apr	May	Jun	Jul	Aug	Sep	Oct	Nov	Dec	Year
Mean daily maximum °C (°F)	18.4 (65.1)	21.0 (69.8)	25.0 (77.0)	29.5 (85.1)	33.2 (91.8)	35.9 (96.6)	36.1 (97.0)	35.3 (95.5)	33.6 (92.5)	29.5 (85.1)	24.9 (76.8)	20.1 (68.2)	28.5 (83.4)
Daily mean °C (°F)	10.8 (51.4)	13.0 (55.4)	16.9 (62.4)	21.4 (70.5)	25.4 (77.7)	28.8 (83.8)	29.2 (84.6)	28.5 (83.3)	26.5 (79.7)	22.1 (71.8)	17.4 (63.3)	12.7 (54.9)	21.1 (69.9)
Mean daily minimum °C (°F)	3.2 (37.8)	5.1 (41.2)	8.8 (47.8)	13.4 (56.1)	17.7 (63.9)	21.7 (71.1)	22.3 (72.1)	21.7 (71.1)	19.4 (66.9)	14.8 (58.6)	10.0 (50.0)	5.3 (41.5)	13.6 (56.5)
Average precipitation mm (inches)	2 (0.1)	2 (0.1)	3 (0.1)	2 (0.1)	4 (0.2)	4 (0.2)	2 (0.1)	5 (0.2)	5 (0.2)	3 (0.1)	3 (0.1)	3 (0.1)	38 (1.6)
Source: climate-data.org

== Transportation ==
Idlès lies just north of the N55 national highway, which leads west to In Amguel and east to Bordj El Houasse. Another road leads south from the highway to Tazrouk.

== Education ==
1.7% of the population has a tertiary education (the equal lowest in the province), and another 10.6% has completed secondary education. The overall literacy rate is 65.1%, and is 79.9% among males and 48.4% among females.

== Localities ==
The commune is composed of six localities:

- Idlès
- Mertoutek
- Hirhafek
- Tizaït
- Tassili Alaksad Partie Nord
- Amguid
