= Talan Teidit =

Talat Teidit
- Village
- Location within Algeria
- Coordinates: 22°39′39″N 5°32′22″E
- Country: Algeria
- Province: Tamanrasset Province
- District: Tamanrasset District
- Commune: Tamanrasset
- Elevation: 1,279 m (4,196 ft)
- Time zone: UTC+1 (CET)

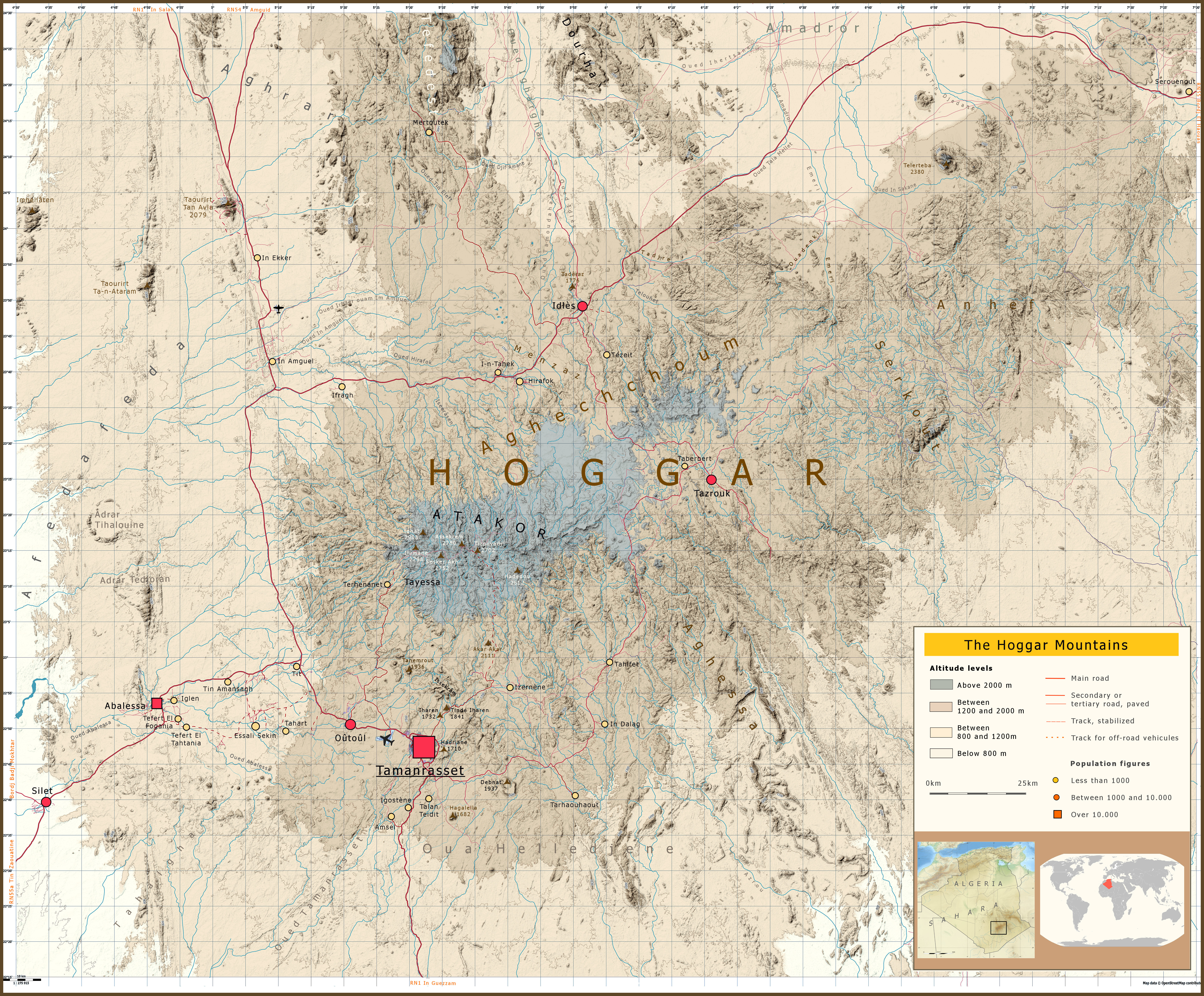
Map of the Hoggar Massif with Talan Teidit south of Tamanrasset

Talan Teidit (also written Tala-n-Tehidit) is a village in the commune of Tamanrasset, in Tamanrasset District, Tamanrasset Province, Algeria, 15 kilometres (9.3 mi) south of the city of Tamanrasset in the Hoggar Mountains.
