= Tarhaouhaout =

- Village
- Location within Algeria
- Coordinates: 22°40′36″N 5°55′15″E
- Country: Algeria
- Province: Tamanrasset Province
- District: Tamanrasset District
- Commune: Tamanrasset
- Elevation: 1,230 m (4,040 ft)
- Time zone: UTC+1 (CET)

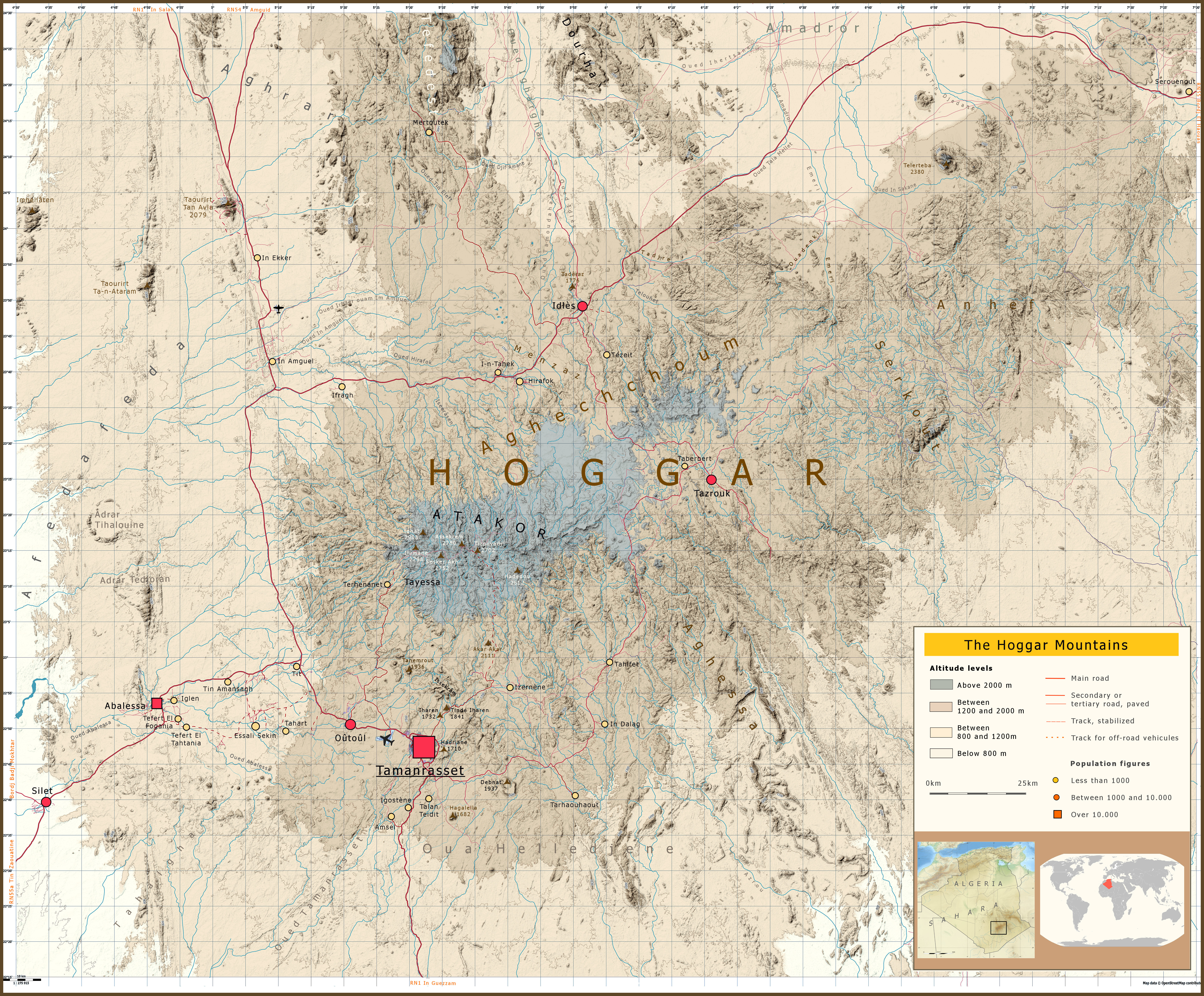
Map of the Hoggar Massif with Tarhaouhaout southeast of Tamanrasset

Tarhaouhaout is a village in the commune of Tamanrasset, in Tamanrasset District, Tamanrasset Province, Algeria. It lies in the Hoggar Mountains 42 kilometres (26 mi) east of the city of Tamanrasset. Fort Motylinsky is located nearby.
