= Izernène =

- Village
- Location within Algeria
- Coordinates: 22°55′53″N 5°44′59″E
- Country: Algeria
- Province: Tamanrasset Province
- District: Tamanrasset District
- Commune: Tamanrasset
- Elevation: 1,636 m (5,367 ft)
- Time zone: UTC+1 (CET)

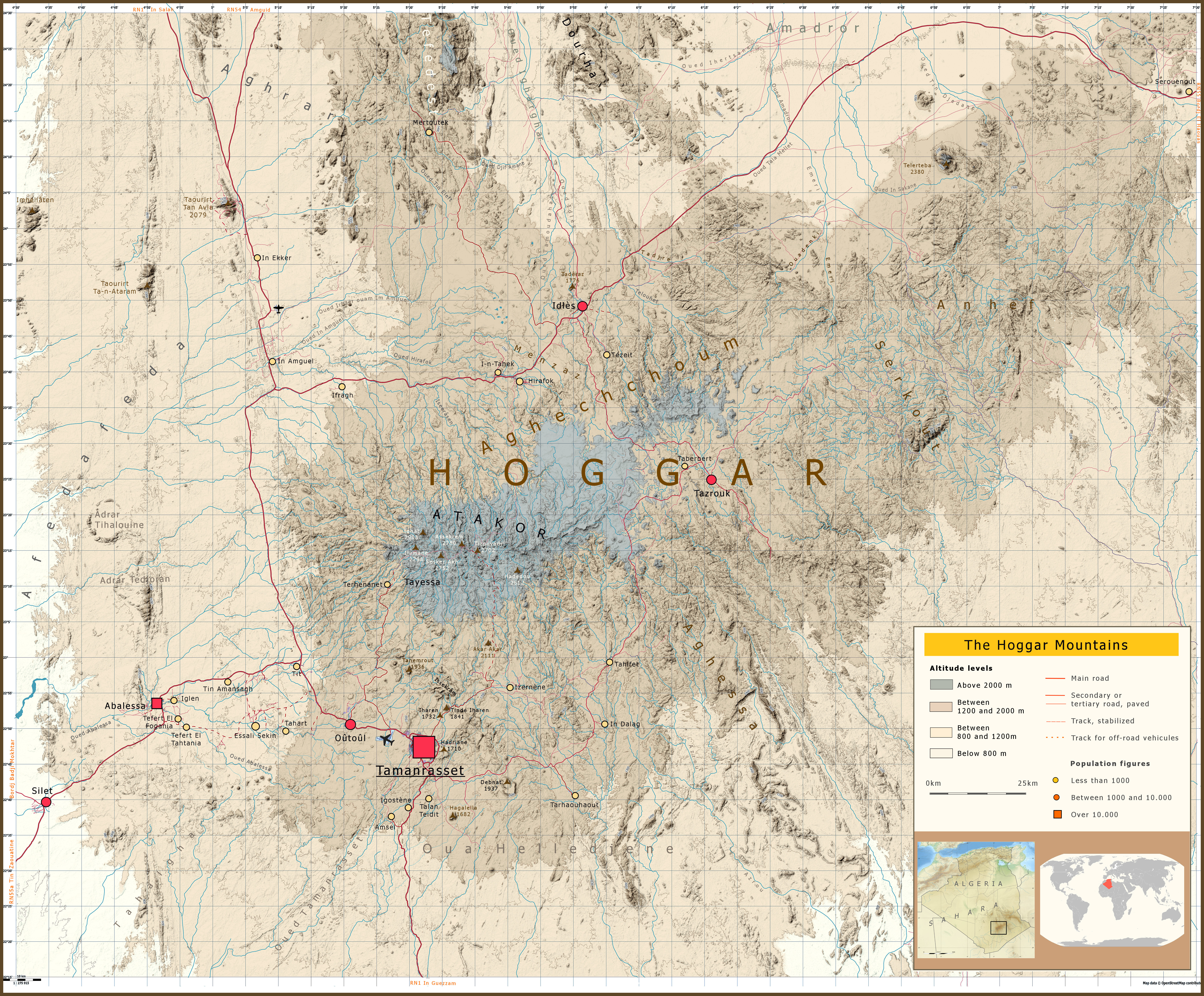
Map of the Hoggar Massif with Izernène northeast of Tamanrasset

Izernène is a village in the commune of Tamanrasset, in Tamanrasset District, Tamanrasset Province, Algeria. It lies in the Hoggar Mountains 28 kilometres (17 mi) northeast of the city of Tamanrasset.
