= Tahifet =

- Village
- Location within Algeria
- Coordinates: 22°59′4″N 6°0′35″E
- Country: Algeria
- Province: Tamanrasset Province
- District: Tamanrasset District
- Commune: Tamanrasset
- Elevation: 1,388 m (4,554 ft)
- Time zone: UTC+1 (CET)

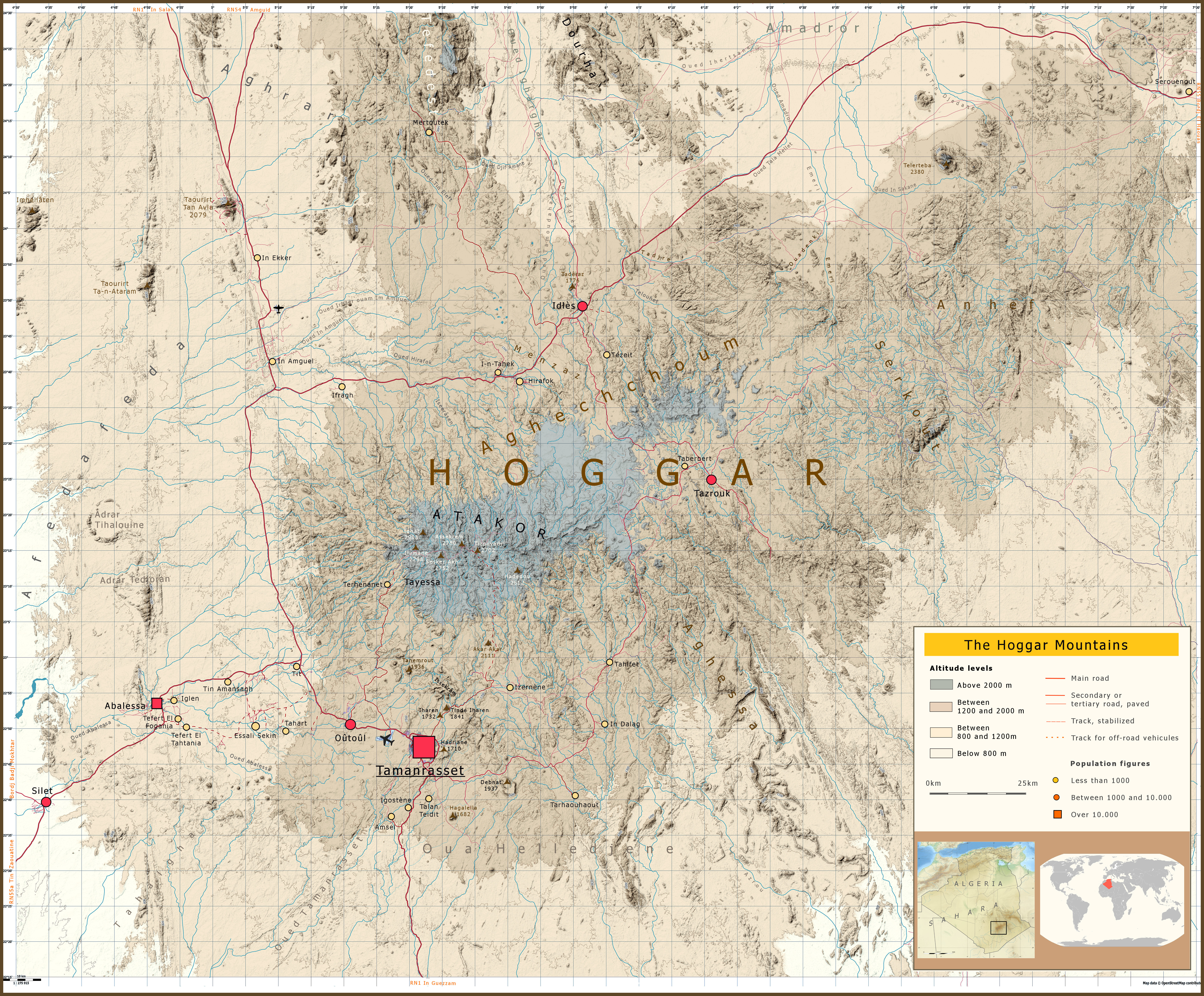
Map of the Hoggar Massif with Tahefet northeast of Tamanrasset

Tahifet is a village located in the commune of Tamanrasset, within Tamanrasset District, Tamanrasset Province, Algeria. It is situated on the east bank of a wadi, approximately 54 kilometres (34 mi) northeast of Tamanrasset city.
