= In Dalag =

- Village
- Location within Algeria
- Coordinates: 22°48′16″N 5°59′31″E
- Country: Algeria
- Province: Tamanrasset Province
- District: Tamanrasset District
- Commune: Tamanrasset
- Elevation: 1,248 m (4,094 ft)
- Time zone: UTC+1 (CET)

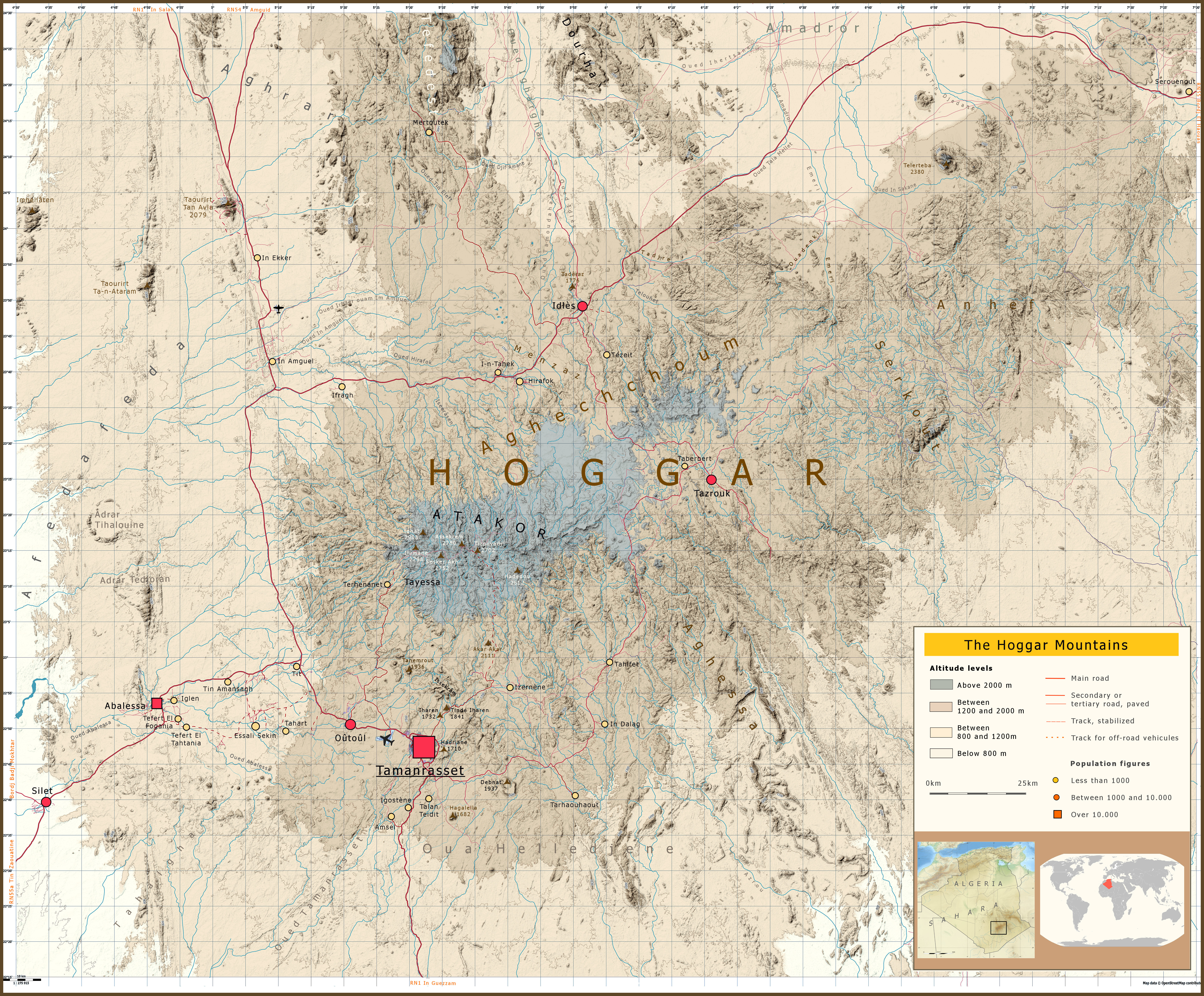
Map of the Hoggar Massif with In Dalag east of Tamanrasset

In Dalag (also written I-n-Daladj) is a village in the commune of Tamanrasset, in Tamanrasset District, Tamanrasset Province, Algeria. It lies on the west bank of Oued i-n-Daladj in the Hoggar Mountains, 48 kilometres (30 mi) east of Tamanrasset city.
