= Tit, Tamanrasset =

Tit
- Village
- Location within Algeria
- Coordinates: 22°57′42″N 5°12′9″E
- Country: Algeria
- Province: Tamanrasset Province
- District: Tamanrasset District
- Commune: Tamanrasset
- Elevation: 1,121 m (3,678 ft)
- Time zone: UTC+1 (CET)

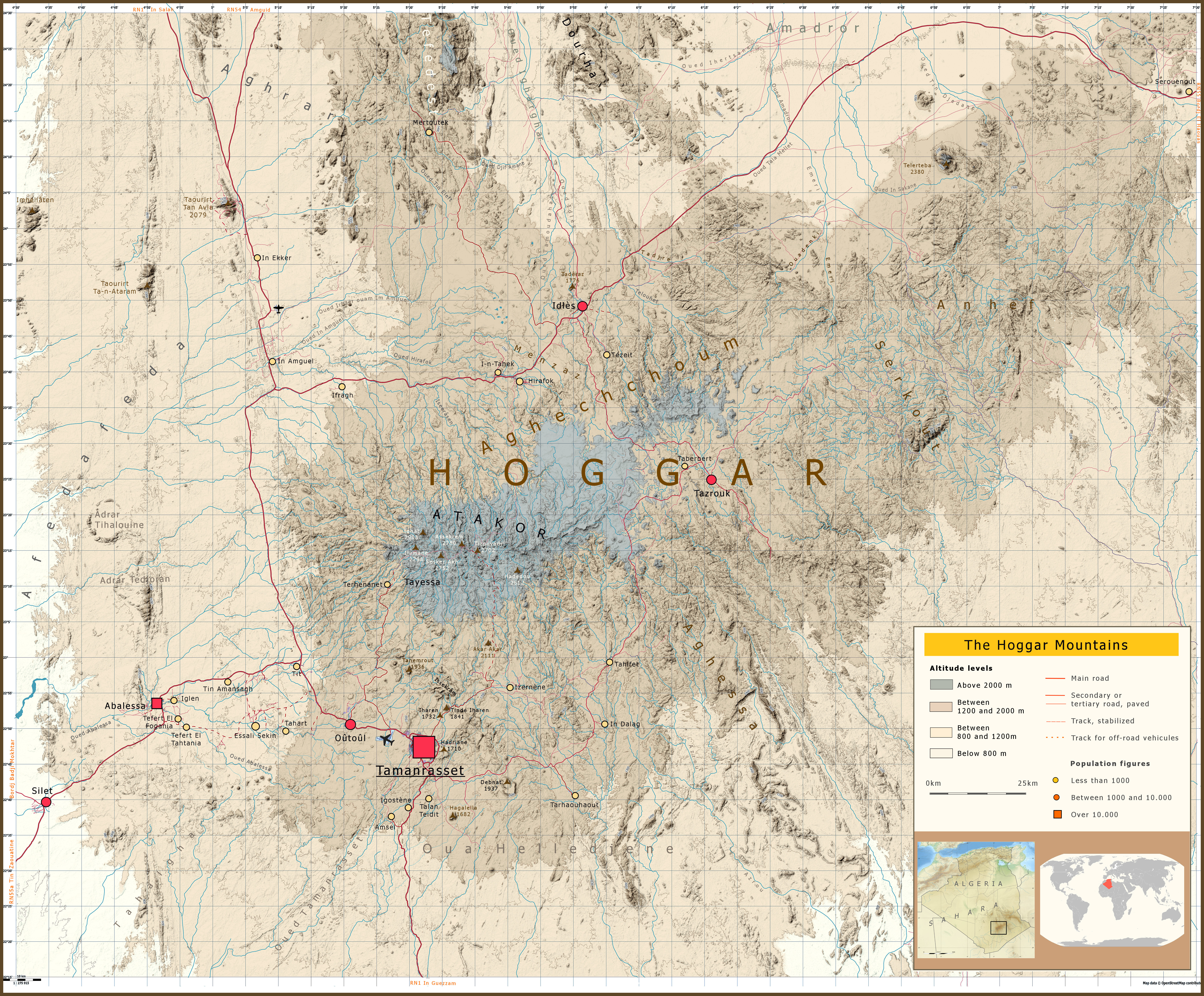
Map of the Hoggar Massif with Tit northwest of Tamanrasset

Tit is a village in the commune of Tamanrasset, in Tamanrasset District, Tamanrasset Province, Algeria. It lies on the southern bank of Oued Abalessa 38 kilometres (24 mi) northwest of Tamanrasset city. It is known for the battle of Tit which took place in May 1902 between the French colonial empire and the Kel Ahaggar.
