= Outoul =

- Village
- Location within Algeria
- Coordinates: 22°50′25″N 5°20′15″E
- Country: Algeria
- Province: Tamanrasset Province
- District: Tamanrasset District
- Commune: Tamanrasset
- Elevation: 1,314 m (4,311 ft)
- Time zone: UTC+1 (CET)

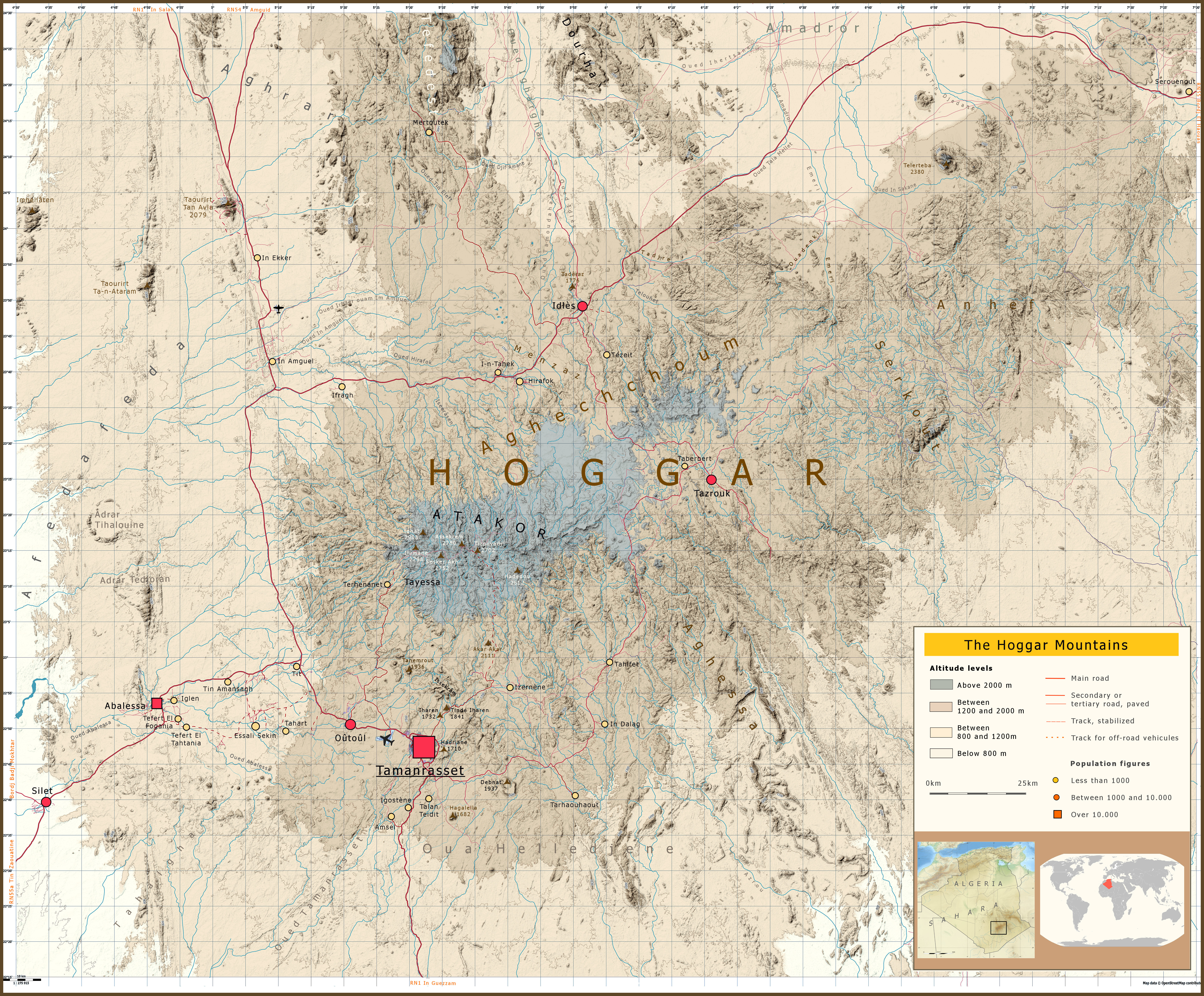
Map of the Hoggar Massif with Outoul west of Tamanrasset

Outoul (also written Ouloul) is a village in the commune of Tamanrasset, in Tamanrasset District, Tamanrasset Province, Algeria. It lies on the east bank of Oued Outoul 21 kilometres (13 mi) west of Tamanrasset city.
