= Tarhenanet =

- Village
- Location within Algeria
- Coordinates: 23°9′52″N 5°26′52″E
- Country: Algeria
- Province: Tamanrasset Province
- District: Tamanrasset District
- Commune: Tamanrasset
- Elevation: 1,841 m (6,040 ft)
- Time zone: UTC+1 (CET)

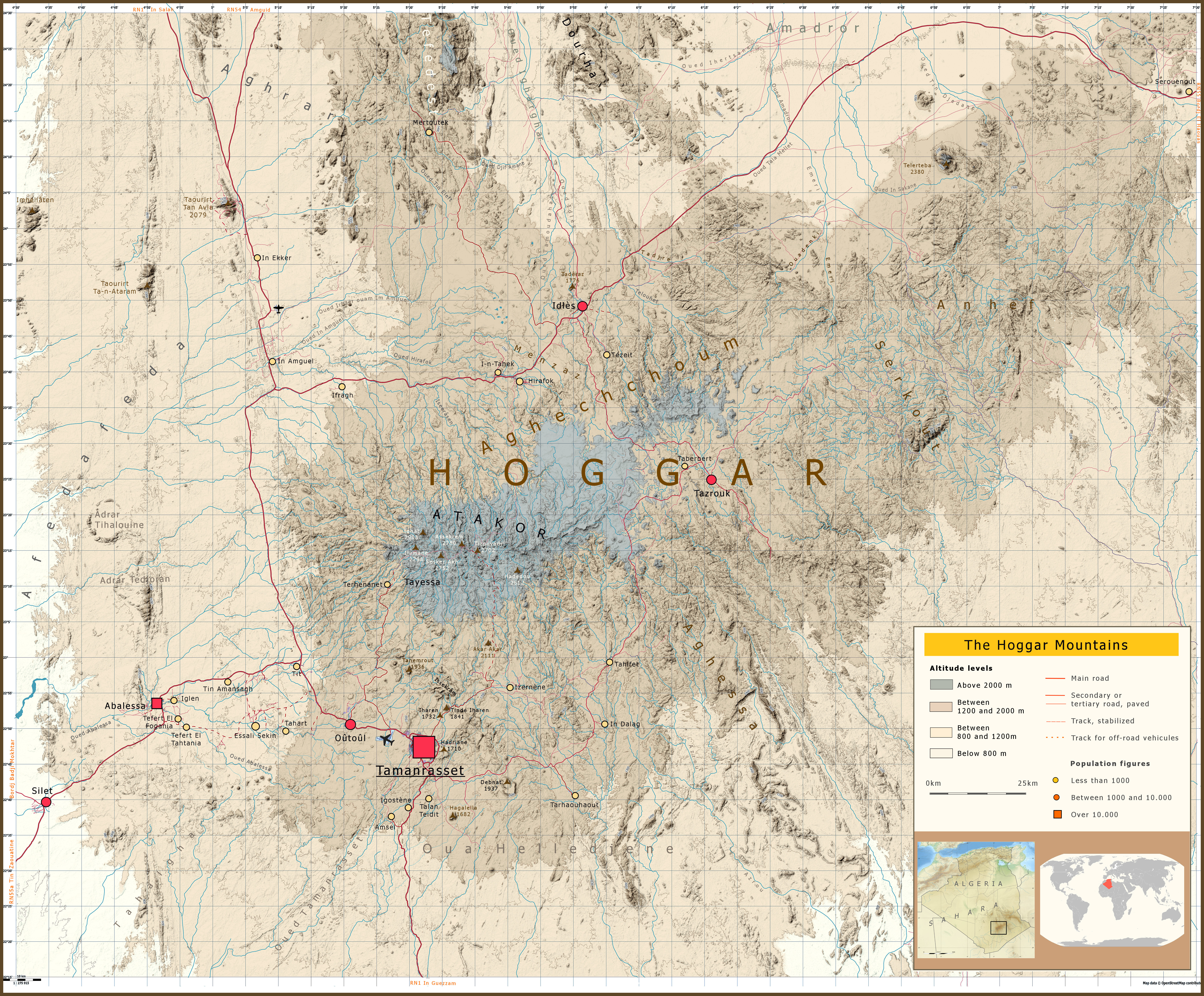
Map of the Hoggar Massif with Tarhenanet north of Tamanrasset

Tarhenanet (also known as Teghenânet) is a village in the commune of Tamanrasset, in Tamanrasset District, Tamanrasset Province, Algeria. It lies 42 kilometres (26 mi) north of Tamanrasset city in the Hoggar Mountains.
