= Amsel, Algeria =

Amsel
- Village
- Location within Algeria
- Coordinates: 22°37′32″N 5°27′18″E
- Country: Algeria
- Province: Tamanrasset Province
- District: Tamanrasset District
- Commune: Tamanrasset
- Elevation: 1,205 m (3,953 ft)
- Time zone: UTC+1 (CET)

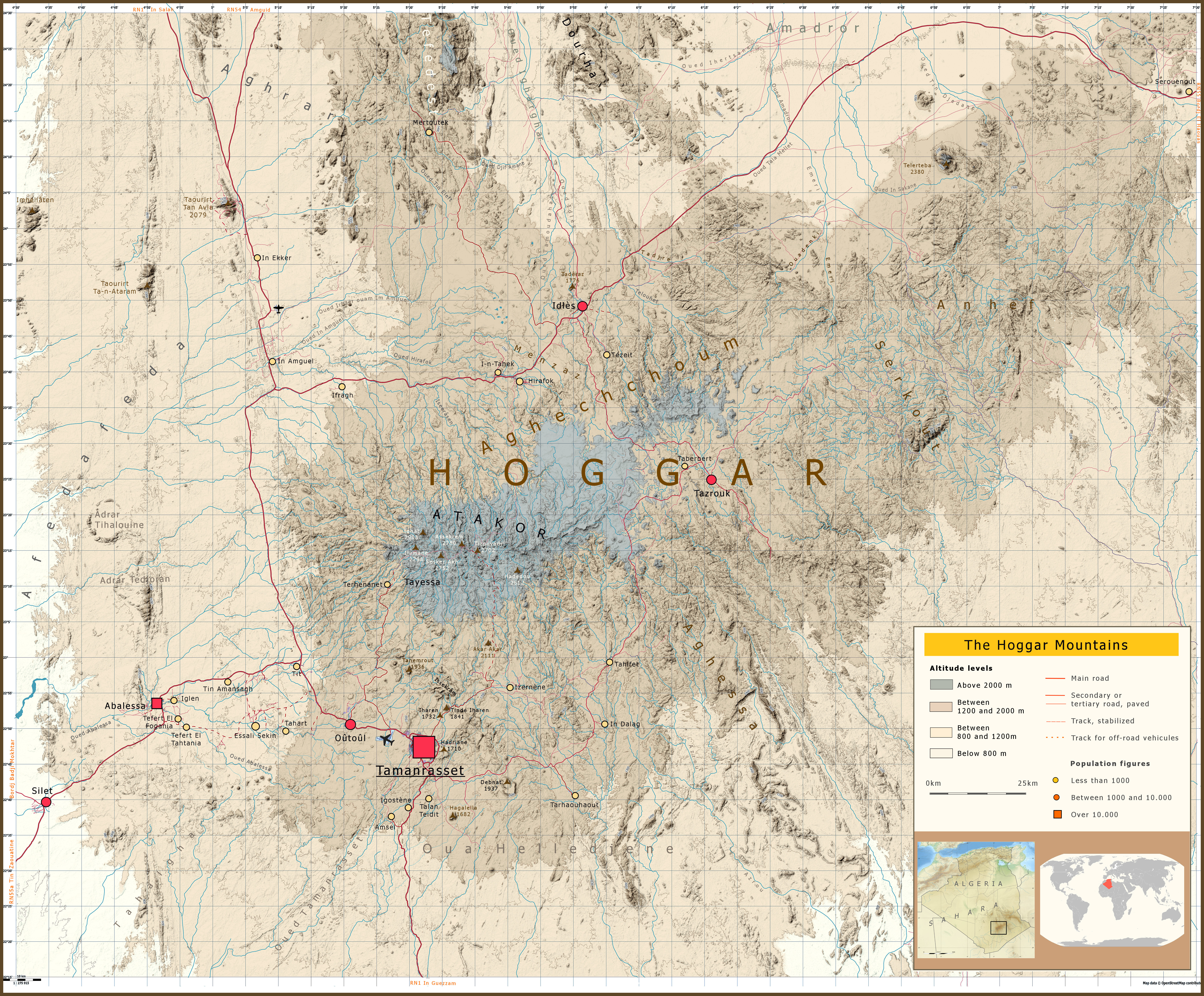
Map of the Hoggar Massif with Amsel south of Tamanrasset

Amsel is a village in the commune of Tamanrasset, in Tamanrasset District, Tamanrasset Province, Algeria. It lies on the east bank of Oued Irzerzou 19 kilometres (12 mi) south of Tamanrasset city.
