= François-Henry Laperrine =

French general

- Born: Marie Joseph François Henry Laperrine d'Hautpoul; September 29, 1860; Castelnaudary, France
- Died: March 5, 1920 (aged 59); Sahara, French Algeria

François-Henry Laperrine (born Marie Joseph François Henry Laperrine d'Hautpoul, September 29, 1860 – March 5, 1920) was a French general who served during World War I.

== Biography ==
Laperrine entered the École Spéciale Militaire de Saint-Cyr in October 1878 and became a captain in the 2nd Dragoons in November 1891. Laperrine organized the Compagnie Méharistes Sahariennes in 1897. He was a friend of Charles de Foucauld who was killed in 1916 in Tamanrasset. The two were honored on a stamp of Algeria in 1950.

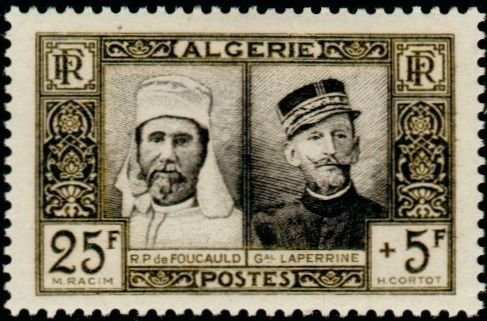

Laperrine died after a plane crash (a Breguet) in the Sahara in 1920. His companions, Lieutenant Bernard and mechanic Marcel Vasselin survived and recorded Laperrine's last words, "People think they know the desert...People think I know it. Nobody really knows it. I have crossed the Sahara ten times and I will stay here." Bernard and Vasselin buried Laperrine near the plane, but when a rescue party arrived he was disinterred and buried in Tamanrasset next to Foucauld. The fort was named for Laperrine.

== Honors ==
- Grand officier de la Légion d'honneur
- Croix de guerre 1914–1918
- Médaille coloniale avec agrafes Algérie, Soudan, Sénégal, Sahara, AOF
- Croix de guerre belge 1914–1918 avec palme
