= Tazrouk =

Tazrouk تاظروك
- Commune and town
- Location of Tazrouk within Tamanrasset Province

- Location of Tazrouk within Algeria
- Coordinates: 23°25′13″N 6°15′56″E
- Country: Algeria
- Province: Tamanrasset
- District: Tazrouk (seat)

Area
  - Total: 76,125 km^{2} (29,392 sq mi)
- Elevation: 1,827 m (5,994 ft)

Population (2008)
  - Total: 4,091
  - Density: 0.05374/km^{2} (0.1392/sq mi)
- Time zone: UTC+01 (CET)
- Postal code: 11140
- ONS code: 1106

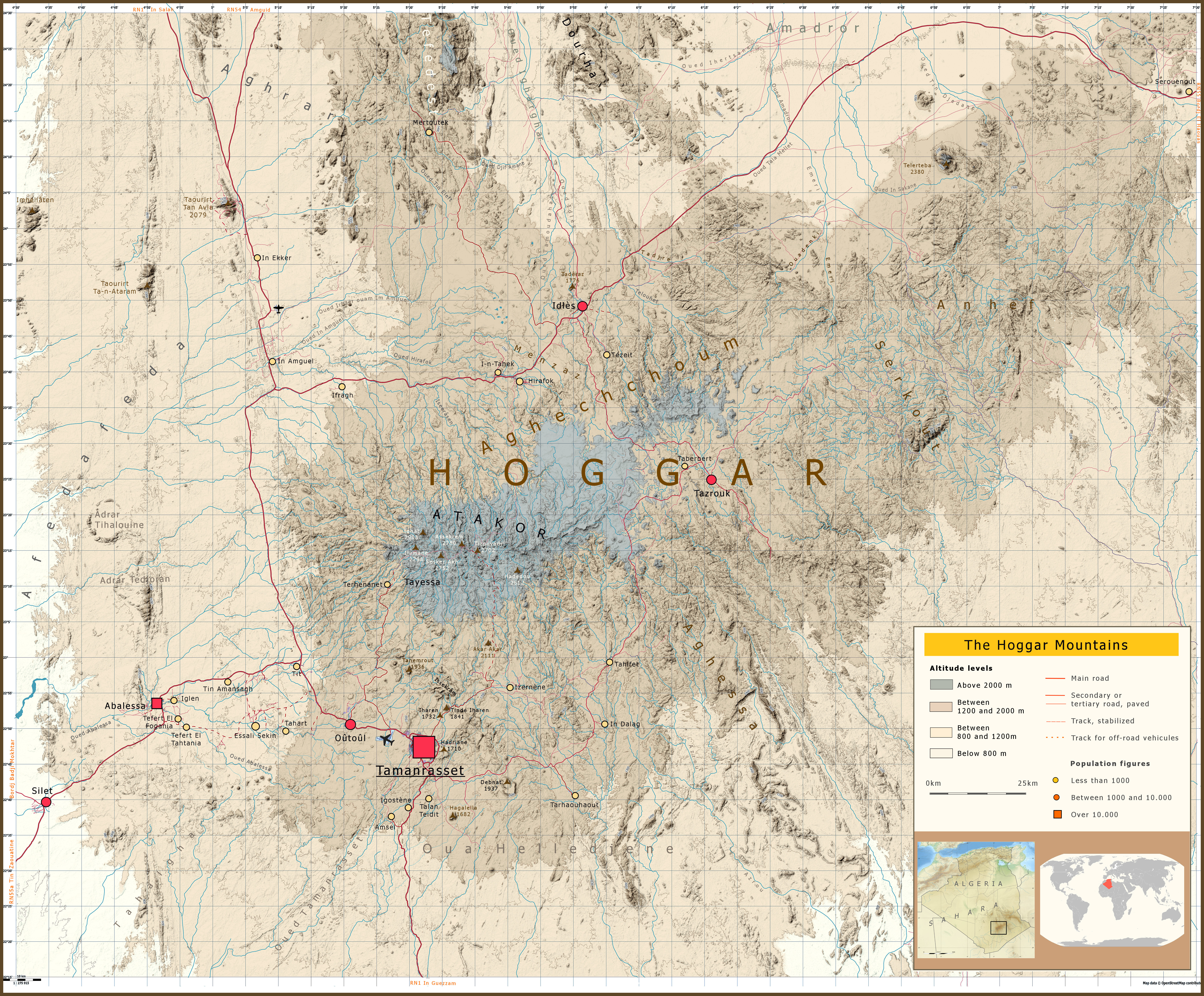
Topographic map of the Hoggar Massif with Tazrouk between the G and A of HOGGAR

Tazrouk (Arabic: تازروك or تاظروك) is a town and commune, and district seat of Tazrouk District in Tamanrasset Province, Algeria. According to the 2008 census it has a population of 4,208, up from 3,033 in 1998, with an annual growth rate of 3.1%. Its postal code is 11140 and its municipal code is 1106.

== Geography ==
Tazrouk is located in the Hoggar mountains at an altitude of 1,827 metres (5,994 ft). Most of the town is located on the east bank of a wadi that runs past the town from the northwest to the southeast.

== Climate ==
Tazrouk has a hot desert climate (Köppen climate classification BWh), with hot summers and cool winters, and little precipitation throughout the year. The climate is quite moderate compared to much of the rest of the Sahara due to the high altitude, and precipitation, while still low, is somewhat more frequent.

Climate data for Tazrouk
| Month | Jan | Feb | Mar | Apr | May | Jun | Jul | Aug | Sep | Oct | Nov | Dec | Year |
|---|---|---|---|---|---|---|---|---|---|---|---|---|---|
| Mean daily maximum °C (°F) | 16.4 (61.5) | 19.0 (66.2) | 22.9 (73.2) | 27.5 (81.5) | 31.2 (88.2) | 33.5 (92.3) | 33.7 (92.7) | 32.9 (91.2) | 31.2 (88.2) | 27.3 (81.1) | 22.9 (73.2) | 18.2 (64.8) | 26.4 (79.5) |
| Daily mean °C (°F) | 8.9 (48.0) | 11.1 (52.0) | 14.8 (58.6) | 19.4 (66.9) | 23.5 (74.3) | 26.5 (79.7) | 26.9 (80.4) | 26.1 (79.0) | 24.0 (75.2) | 20.0 (68.0) | 15.5 (59.9) | 10.9 (51.6) | 19.0 (66.1) |
| Mean daily minimum °C (°F) | 1.4 (34.5) | 3.2 (37.8) | 6.8 (44.2) | 11.4 (52.5) | 15.8 (60.4) | 19.5 (67.1) | 20.1 (68.2) | 19.4 (66.9) | 16.9 (62.4) | 12.7 (54.9) | 8.1 (46.6) | 3.6 (38.5) | 11.6 (52.8) |
| Average precipitation mm (inches) | 3 (0.1) | 3 (0.1) | 5 (0.2) | 4 (0.2) | 5 (0.2) | 6 (0.2) | 4 (0.2) | 7 (0.3) | 7 (0.3) | 4 (0.2) | 4 (0.2) | 3 (0.1) | 55 (2.3) |
Source: climate-data.org

== Transportation ==
Tazrouk is connected to the N55 highway near Idlès by a local road leading to the north.

== Education ==
3.0% of the population has a tertiary education, and another 12.1% has completed secondary education. The overall literacy rate is 82.2%, and is 91.1% among males and 72.4% among females.

== Localities ==
The commune is composed of nine localities:

- Tazrouk
- In Ezzane
- Serkout
- Tin Tarabine
- Col d'Azrou portion Nord
- Tassili Alaksad Partie Sud
- Région de Ahnat
- Tazoulet
- Akal Gazoulène
