= Amschel =

Amschel is a given name. Notable people with the name include:

- Amschel Mayer Rothschild (1773–1855), German Jewish banker of the Rothschild family financial dynasty
- Amschel Mayor James Rothschild (1955–1996), youngest child of Victor Rothschild and his second wife
- Amschel Moses Rothschild (died 1755), 18th-century German Jewish moneychanger and trader in silk cloth
- Mayer Amschel de Rothschild (1818–1874), youngest son of Nathan Mayer Rothschild (1777–1836)
- Mayer Amschel Rothschild (1744–1812), the founder of the Rothschild family international banking dynasty
- Franz Kafka's Hebrew name was Amschel
