= In Amguel =

In Amguel عين امقل
- Commune and town
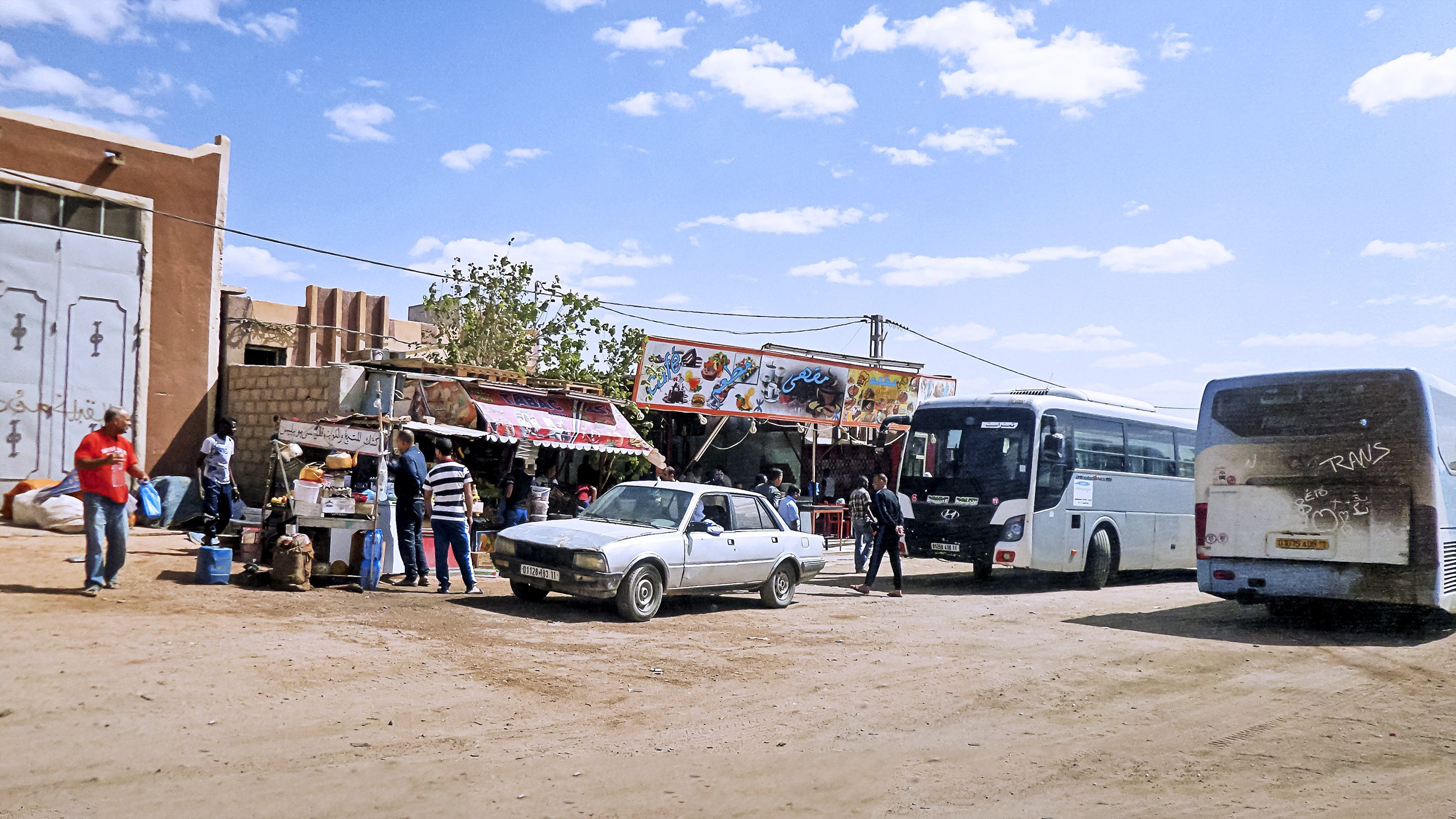

- Location of In Amguel commune within Tamanrasset Province

- Location of In Amguel within Algeria
- Coordinates: 23°41′37″N 5°9′53″E
- Country: Algeria
- Province: Tamanrasset Province
- District: Tamanrasset District

Area
  - Total: 101,367 km^{2} (39,138 sq mi)
- Elevation: 980 m (3,220 ft)

Population (2008)
  - Total: 4,208
  - Density: 0.04151/km^{2} (0.1075/sq mi)
- Time zone: UTC+1 (CET)
- PMA seats (as of 2007): 7
- ONS code: 1109
- Postal code: 11100

In Amguel (Arabic: عين امقل, lit. Amguel spring) is a town and commune in Tamanrasset District, Tamanrasset Province, Algeria. According to the 2008 census it has a population of 4,208, up from 3,030 in 1998, with an annual growth rate of 3.4%. Its postal code is 11100 and its municipal code is 1109.

== Geography ==
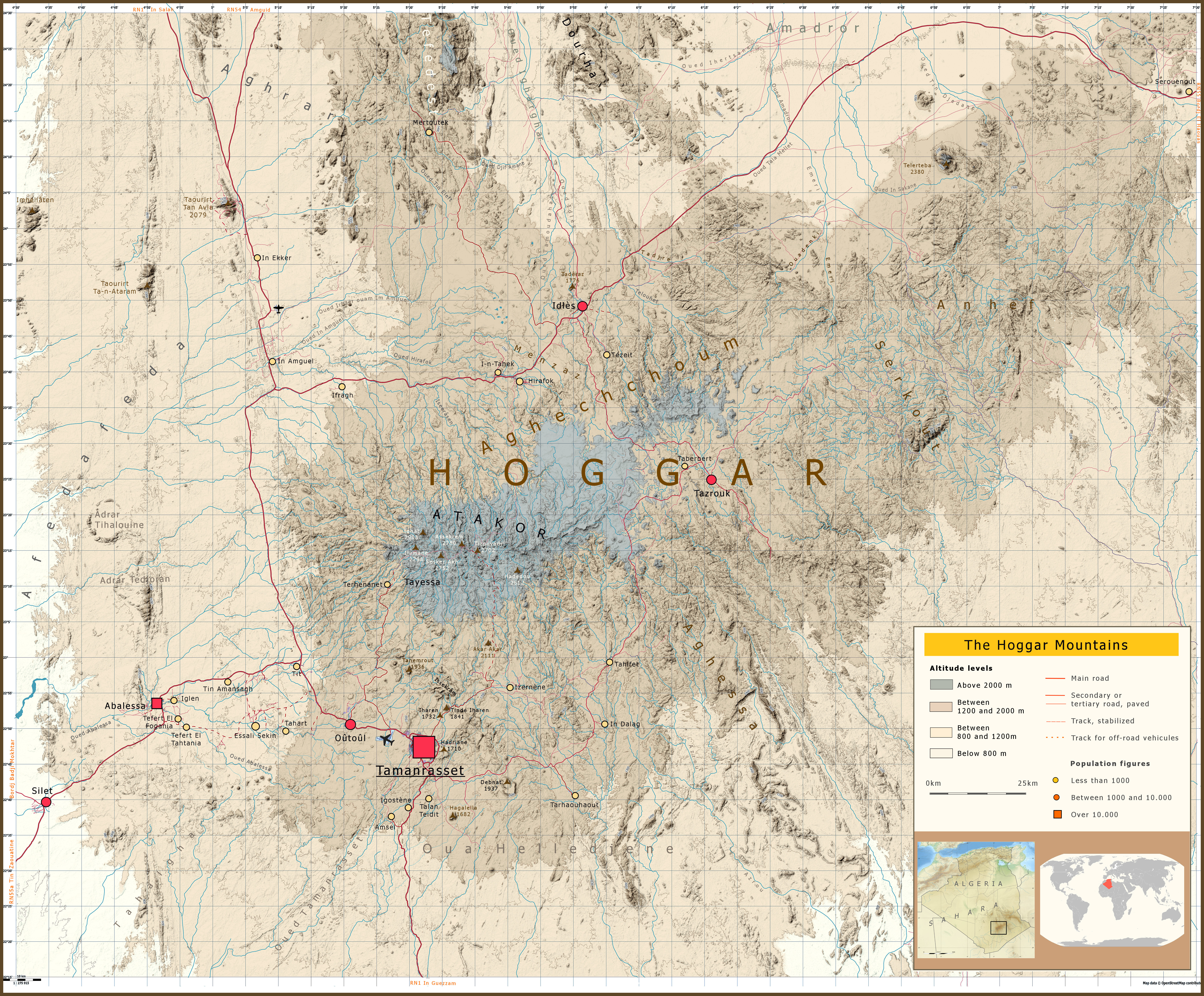
Map of the Hoggar Massif with In Amguel west of Idlès and northwest of Tamanrasset

In Amguel lies at an elevation of 980 metres (3,220 ft) on the southern bank of a wadi that cuts through a plateau lying to the northwest of the Hoggar Mountains. The numerous wadis in the area support some vegetation, but beyond them the land is barren and rocky.

In Amguel is notable for being the location of several underground nuclear tests conducted by the French military. They include the now infamous Béryl incident which released a cloud of radioactive dust outside the tunnel entrance, contaminating officials viewing the test.

== Climate ==
In Amguel has a hot desert climate (Köppen climate classification BWh), with very hot summers and mild winters, and very little precipitation throughout the year.

Climate data for In Amguel
Month	Jan	Feb	Mar	Apr	May	Jun	Jul	Aug	Sep	Oct	Nov	Dec	Year
Mean daily maximum °C (°F)	20.8 (69.4)	23.4 (74.1)	27.2 (81.0)	31.8 (89.2)	35.4 (95.7)	38.1 (100.6)	38.3 (100.9)	37.5 (99.5)	35.8 (96.4)	31.8 (89.2)	27.2 (81.0)	22.5 (72.5)	30.8 (87.5)
Daily mean °C (°F)	13.1 (55.6)	15.4 (59.7)	19.0 (66.2)	23.6 (74.5)	27.6 (81.7)	31.0 (87.8)	31.3 (88.3)	30.7 (87.3)	28.8 (83.8)	24.5 (76.1)	19.6 (67.3)	15.0 (59.0)	23.3 (73.9)
Mean daily minimum °C (°F)	5.5 (41.9)	7.5 (45.5)	10.9 (51.6)	15.5 (59.9)	19.8 (67.6)	23.9 (75.0)	24.4 (75.9)	24.0 (75.2)	21.8 (71.2)	17.3 (63.1)	12.1 (53.8)	7.5 (45.5)	15.9 (60.5)
Average precipitation mm (inches)	1 (0.0)	1 (0.0)	2 (0.1)	1 (0.0)	3 (0.1)	3 (0.1)	2 (0.1)	5 (0.2)	5 (0.2)	2 (0.1)	1 (0.0)	2 (0.1)	28 (1)
Source: climate-data.org

== Transportation ==
In Amguel is located on the N1 national highway, leading north to In Salah and south to Tamanrasset. Just to the south of the town, the N55 branches from the N1, leading to Bordj El Houasse.

== Education ==
4.2% of the population has a tertiary education, and another 11.4% has completed secondary education. The overall literacy rate is 71.1%, and is 77.7% among males and 63.8% among females.

== Localities ==
The commune is composed of eight localities:

- In Amguel
- In Eker
- Tasnou
- Maniet
- Arak
- Tahaggart
- Région de Ahnat
- Imidir
