= Amsel (surname) =

Amsel is a surname. Notable people with the surname include:

- Beth Amsel, singer-songwriter
- Hans Georg Amsel (1905–1999), German entomologist
- Richard Amsel (1947–1985), American illustrator and graphic designer
- Lena Amsel (1898–1928), was a dancer and actress.

Fictional characters:

- General Heinrich Amsel, Nazi general and antagonist in Call of Duty: World at War

== See also ==
- Juraj Amšel, water polo player
