= Tazrouk District =

Tazrouk District دائرة تاظروك
- District
- Coordinates: 23°25′N 6°16′E
- Country: Algeria
- Province: Tamanrasset
- District seat: Tazrouk

Area
  - Total: 145,070 km^{2} (56,010 sq mi)

Population (2008)
  - Total: 9,036
  - Density: 0.06229/km^{2} (0.1613/sq mi)
- Time zone: UTC+01 (CET)
- Municipalities: 2

Tazrouk is a district in Tamanrasset Province, Algeria. It was named after its capital, Tazrouk. According to the 2008 census, it has a population of 9,036.

== Municipalities ==
The district is further divided into 2 municipalities:

- Tazrouk
- Idlès
