= Tamanrasset =

Tamanrasset Arabic: تامنراست Tamazight: ⵜⵎⵏⵗⵙⵜ
- City
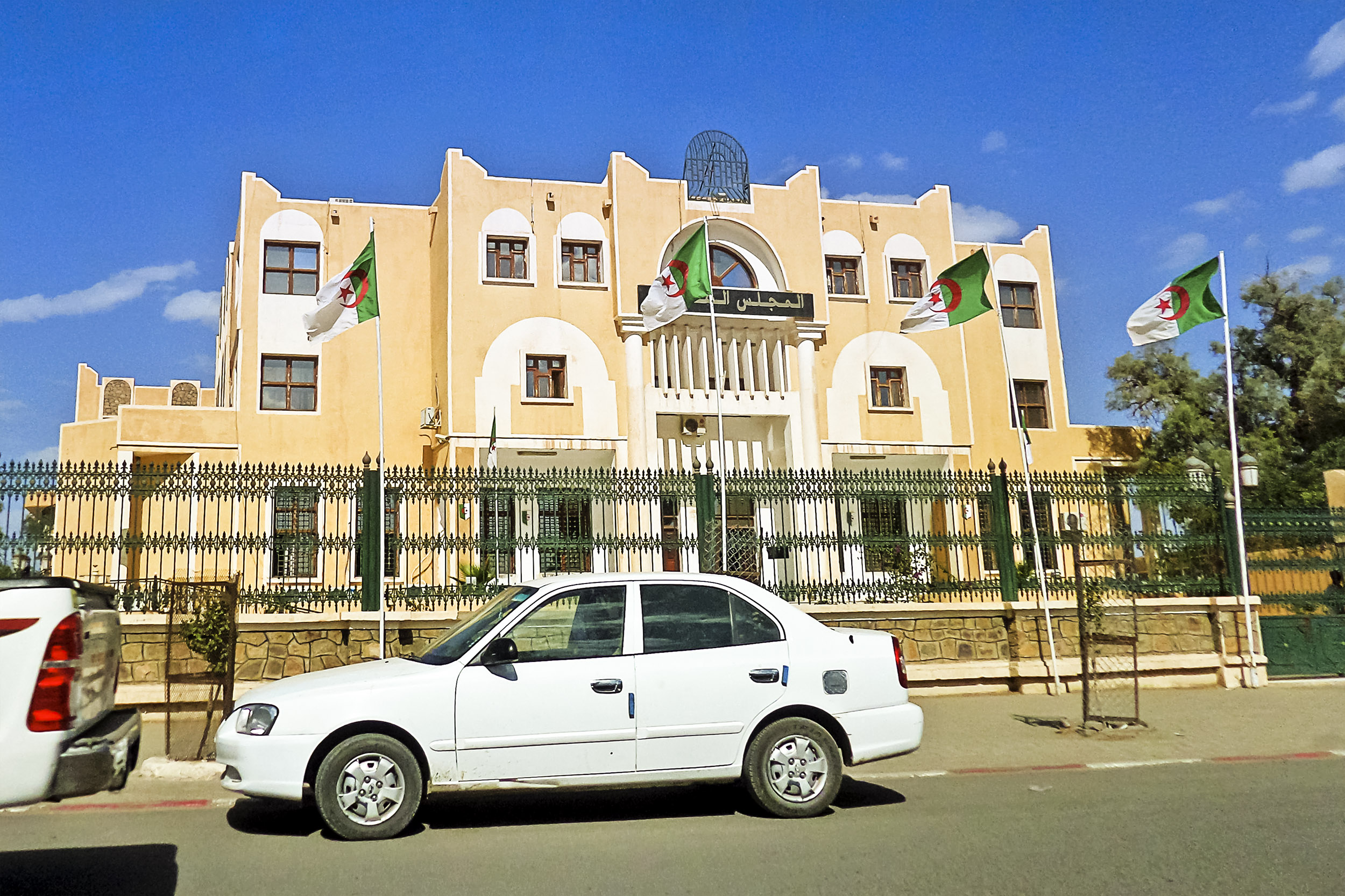
- Tamanrasset assize court

- Location of Tamanrasset commune within Tamanrasset Province

- Location of Tamanrasset within Algeria
- Coordinates: 22°47′20″N 5°31′32″E
- Country: Algeria
- Province: Tamanrasset Province
- District: Tamanrasset District
- Established: 1905

Area
  - Total: 37,713 km^{2} (14,561 sq mi)
- Elevation: 1,320 m (4,330 ft)

Population (2025)
  - Total: 140,955
  - Density: 2/km^{2} (5.2/sq mi)
- Time zone: UTC+1 (CET)
- Postal code: 11000
- Area code: (+213) 29
- PMA seats (as of 2007): 11
- ONS code: 1101
- Climate: BWh

Tamanrasset (/ˌtæmənˈræsət, -sɛt/; Tamazight: ⵜⵎⵏⵗⵙⵜ, romanized: Tmnghst, Arabic: تامنراست, romanized: Tāmanrāssit), also known as Tamanghasset or Tamenghest, is an oasis city and capital of Tamanrasset Province in southern Algeria, in the Ahaggar Mountains. It is the chief city of the Algerian Tuareg. It is located at an altitude of 1,320 metres (4,330 ft). As of the 2008 census, it had a population of 92,635, up from 72,741 in 1998, with an annual growth rate of 2.5%. It was estimated to be up to 116,521 in 2019 and 140,955 in 2025.

Tamanrasset was originally established as a military outpost to guard the trans-Saharan trade routes. Surrounded by the barren Sahara, very high temperatures have been recorded here. Tamanrasset is located at an oasis where citrus fruits, apricots, dates, almonds, cereals, corn, and figs are grown, despite the difficult climate. The Tuareg people were once the town's main inhabitants. Tamanrasset is a tourist attraction during the cooler months; visitors are drawn to the Museum of the Hoggar, which offers many exhibits depicting Tuareg life and culture.

The city is served by Tamanrasset Airport and the Trans-Sahara Highway.

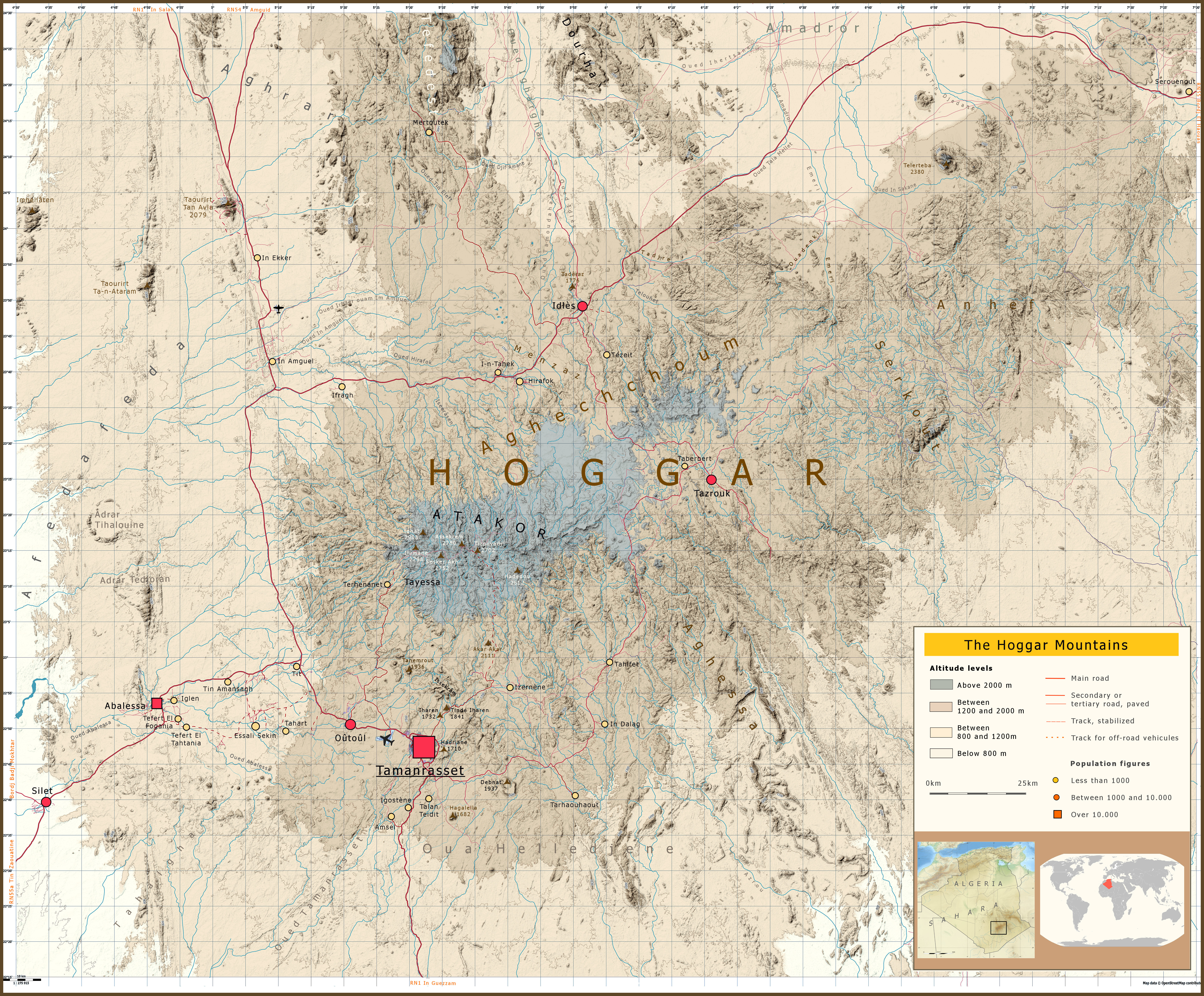
Topographic map of the Hoggar Massif with Tamanrasset

== History ==
This name is said to derive from "Imanrassaten"—the name of a noble tribe now associated with the Ajjers—which reportedly once inhabited the wadi region or used it to mark the boundaries of its grazing lands.

Tamanrasset originated as the centre of a network of camel caravan trading routes from Kano, Lake Chad, Gao, Agades and Zinder. When Algeria was under French rule, the Catholic priest Charles de Foucauld built his hermitage here in 1905; he established the fort by 1915.

Foucauld was shot to death outside his Tamanrasset compound by Sermi ag Thora under the command of El Madani ag Soba on 1 December 1916.

As a military post, the settlement was named Fort Laperrine, after General François-Henry Laperrine's death in the desert nearby in 1922.

On 1 May 1962, near Ecker, 150 km north of Tamanrasset, there was an accidental venting of a French underground nuclear test. Due to improper sealing of the shaft, a spectacular flame burst through the concrete cap and radioactive gases and dust were vented into the atmosphere. The plume climbed up to 2600 m high and radiation was detected hundreds of kilometres away. About a hundred French soldiers and officials, including two ministers, were irradiated. The number of contaminated Algerians is unknown.

In March 2003 Air Algérie Flight 6289 crashed in the city.

In 2010, the oasis town was the site of the Joint Military Staff Committee headquarters for combating Al-Qaeda in Islamic Maghreb. The four-country Committee (Algeria, Mali, Niger, Mauritania) intends to use Tamanrasset to coordinate their military activity in the Pan-Sahel.

== Climate ==
Tamanrasset has a hot desert climate (Köppen climate classification BWh), with very hot summers (which are moderated by its elevation) and mild winters. There is very little rain throughout the year, although occasional rain does fall in late summer from the northern extension of the Intertropical Convergence Zone.

Climate data for Tamanrasset, Algeria (1991–2020)
Month	Jan	Feb	Mar	Apr	May	Jun	Jul	Aug	Sep	Oct	Nov	Dec	Year
Record high °C (°F)	30.5 (86.9)	32.9 (91.2)	33.9 (93.0)	37.5 (99.5)	38.8 (101.8)	41.0 (105.8)	41.4 (106.5)	39.5 (103.1)	37.8 (100.0)	35.9 (96.6)	31.6 (88.9)	28.6 (83.5)	41.4 (106.5)
Mean daily maximum °C (°F)	20.5 (68.9)	22.8 (73.0)	26.4 (79.5)	31.0 (87.8)	34.2 (93.6)	36.1 (97.0)	36.1 (97.0)	35.3 (95.5)	34.2 (93.6)	30.3 (86.5)	25.4 (77.7)	21.9 (71.4)	29.5 (85.1)
Daily mean °C (°F)	12.7 (54.9)	15.0 (59.0)	18.8 (65.8)	23.3 (73.9)	27.2 (81.0)	29.6 (85.3)	29.8 (85.6)	29.1 (84.4)	27.8 (82.0)	23.6 (74.5)	18.1 (64.6)	14.4 (57.9)	22.4 (72.3)
Mean daily minimum °C (°F)	4.9 (40.8)	7.2 (45.0)	11.2 (52.2)	15.7 (60.3)	20.1 (68.2)	23.1 (73.6)	23.4 (74.1)	22.9 (73.2)	21.4 (70.5)	16.8 (62.2)	10.7 (51.3)	6.9 (44.4)	15.4 (59.7)
Record low °C (°F)	−3.4 (25.9)	−3.7 (25.3)	−1.5 (29.3)	6.0 (42.8)	9.0 (48.2)	16.0 (60.8)	17.6 (63.7)	16.8 (62.2)	15.5 (59.9)	7.4 (45.3)	−1.0 (30.2)	−2.4 (27.7)	−3.7 (25.3)
Average precipitation mm (inches)	1.3 (0.05)	0.9 (0.04)	4.2 (0.17)	0.9 (0.04)	2.9 (0.11)	7.0 (0.28)	8.0 (0.31)	17.8 (0.70)	6.0 (0.24)	8.3 (0.33)	0.5 (0.02)	0.6 (0.02)	58.4 (2.30)
Average precipitation days (≥ 1 mm)	0.3	0.2	0.4	0.1	0.6	1.2	1.2	3.3	1.4	0.9	0.2	0.1	9.9
Mean monthly sunshine hours	288.0	272.9	297.2	299.5	288.8	240.2	286.9	261.2	248.3	282.6	284.2	282.4	3,332.2
Source: NOAA

== Economy ==
As of 1991 Tamanrasset is a centre of trade across the Sahara Desert and into neighbouring countries.

== Communications and transport ==
In 1991 there was a television downlink, but William Langewiesche stated there was "no decent postal service" and "no good road".

== Education ==
4.3% of the population has a tertiary education, and another 14.1% has completed secondary education. The overall literacy rate is 69.8%, and is 78.4% among males and 60.8% among females.

== Localities ==
The commune consists of 14 localities:

- Tamanrasset
- Amsel
- Outoul
- Tit
- Assekrem
- Tahifet
- Tarhenanet
- Tagmart
- Talan Teidit
- Efak
- Ihelfène
- Tarhaouhaout
- In Dalag
- Izernène

== Culture ==
In 1991 William Langewiesche stated that people from the part of Algeria on the Mediterranean Sea "criticize it as an austere place, where Islam is practiced strictly, alcohol is forbidden, and Arab women, even veiled, rarely venture onto the streets."
