= Tamanrasset District =

Tamanrasset District دائرة تمنراست
- District
- Map of Tamanrasset District
- Coordinates: 22°47′N 5°31′E
- Country: Algeria
- Province: Tamanrasset
- District seat: Tamanrasset

Area
  - Total: 131,151 km^{2} (50,638 sq mi)

Population (2008)
  - Total: 96,843
  - Density: 0.73841/km^{2} (1.9125/sq mi)
- Time zone: UTC+01 (CET)
- Municipalities: 2

Tamanrasset is a district in Tamanrasset Province, Algeria. It was named after its capital, Tamanrasset, which is also the capital of the province. With 96,843 people, it is the most populated district in the province (however, the population density is low) and one of the largest districts in the country.

== Municipalities ==
The district is further divided into 2 municipalities:

- Tamanrasset
- In Amguel
