= Tamanrasset Province =

Province of Algeria

Tamanrasset Province ولاية تمنراست
- Province
- Province of Tamanrasset
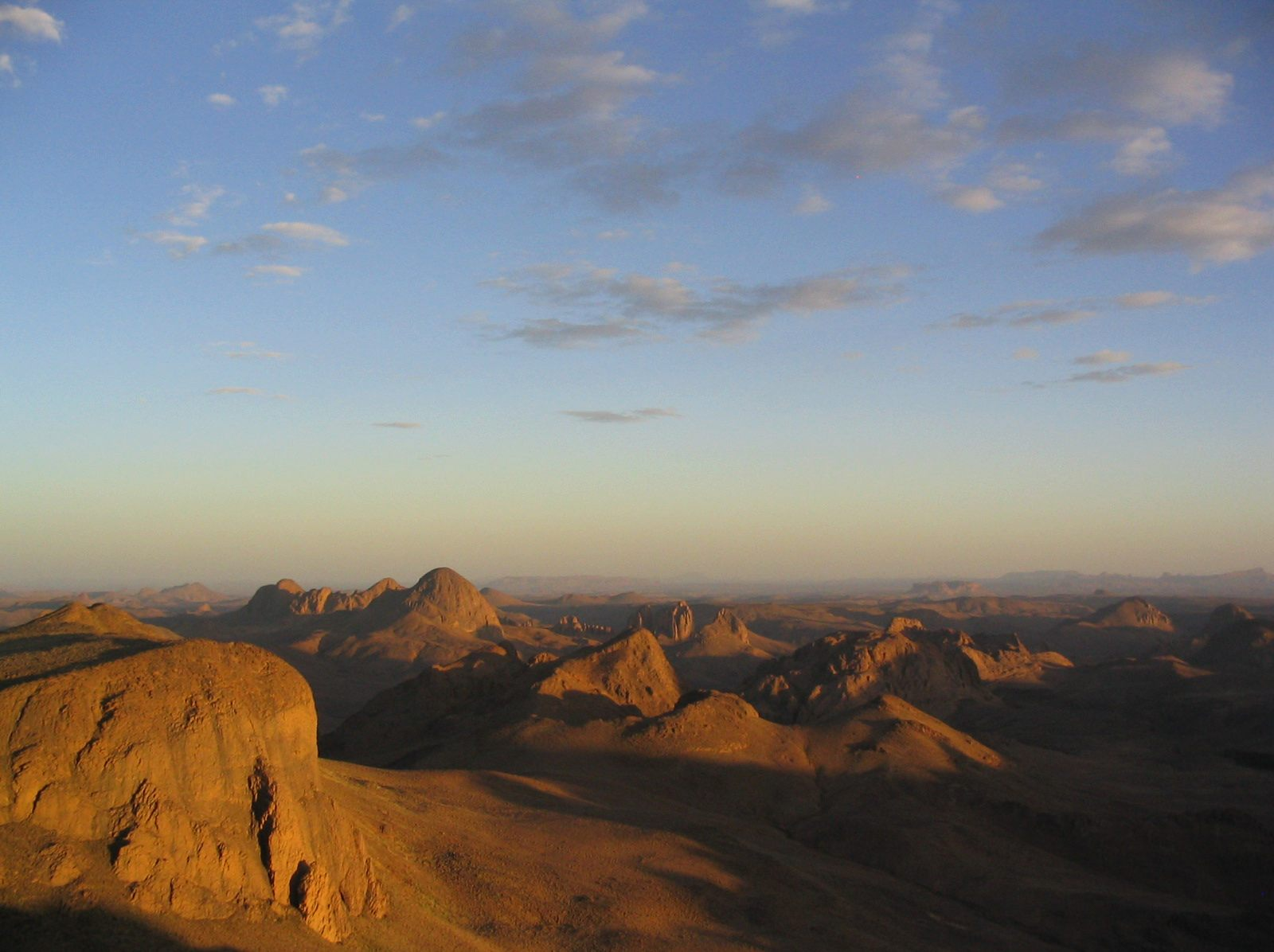
- The Hoggar Mountains in Ahaggar National Park

- Map of Algeria highlighting Tamanrasset
- Coordinates: 22°47′N 05°31′E
- Country: Algeria
- Founded: 2 July 1974
- Capital: Tamanrasset

Government
  - Governor: Mohamed Boudras

Area
  - Total: 336,839 km^{2} (130,054 sq mi)
  - Rank: 1st
- Elevation: 1,400 m (4,600 ft)
- Highest elevation: 3,303 m (10,837 ft)

Population (2008)
  - Total: 115,043 (within current boundaries)
  - Rank: 50th
  - Density: 0.206/km^{2} (0.53/sq mi)
- Time zone: UTC+01 (CET)
- Area Code: +213 (0) 29
- ISO 3166 code: DZ-11
- Districts: 3
- Municipalities: 5

Tamanrasset or Tamanghasset (Arabic: ولاية تمنراست Wilāya Tamanrāssat, Berber languages: ⵜⵣ'ⵓⵏⵜ ⵏ ⴰⴾⴰⵍ ⵜⴰⵏ ⵜⴰⵎⴰⵏⵗⴰⵙⵜ) is a province (wilaya) in southern Algeria, named after its province seat, Tamanrasset. The province is the home of two national parks: Ahaggar National Park and Tassili n'Ajjer National Park. It is the largest province in Algeria, with an area of 336,839 km^{2}. It has a population of 115,043 as of 2008.

== Geography ==
Tamanrasset is located in the deep southern region of Algeria, approximately 2,000 kilometers south of Algiers. It is bordered by In Salah Province on the north, Illizi Province on the northeast, Djanet Province on the east, In Guezzam Province on the south, Bordj Badji Mokhtar Province on the southwest, and Adrar Province on the west. It also borders Agadez Region in Niger to the southeast.

Tamanrasset is located in the heart of the Algerian Desert of the Sahara. In general, the province has a hot desert climate (Köppen climate classification BWh), with very hot summers and mild winters, though more mountainous areas, such as the Hoggar Mountains, tend to have cooler temperatures compared to the flatter southern and western parts of the province. The average altitude of the province is about 1,400 meters. The province is home to the highest peak in Algeria, Mount Tahat, located in the Hoggar Mountains with an elevation of 3,003 meters.

== History ==
In 1961, the village of In Eker, located in present-day Tamanrasset Province, was the location of several underground nuclear tests by the French military. According to the Victims of Nuclear Tests in In Eker, over 500 people in the province of Tamanrasset have been impacted by these tests.

The province was created on 2 July 1974 from the Oasis Department, following a reorganization of Algeria's provinces. In 1983, its borders were modified.

On 26 November 2019 the districts of In Salah and In Guezzam, previously delegated wilayas (provinces), were promoted to province status. Prior to 2019, the area of the province was 557,906 km^{2}.

== Government ==
=== Administrative divisions ===
The province is divided into 3 districts (daïras), which are further divided into 5 communes or municipalities.

District	Commune	Arabic
Abalessa District	Abalessa	أبلسة
Tamanrasset District	In Amguel	عين امقل
Tamanrasset District	Tamanrasset	تامنراست
Tazrouk District	Idlès	إدلس
Tazrouk District	Tazrouk	تاظروك

== See also ==
- In Guezzam Province
- In Salah Province
