= Radiological warfare =

Attacks using radioactive material with intent of contamination of an area

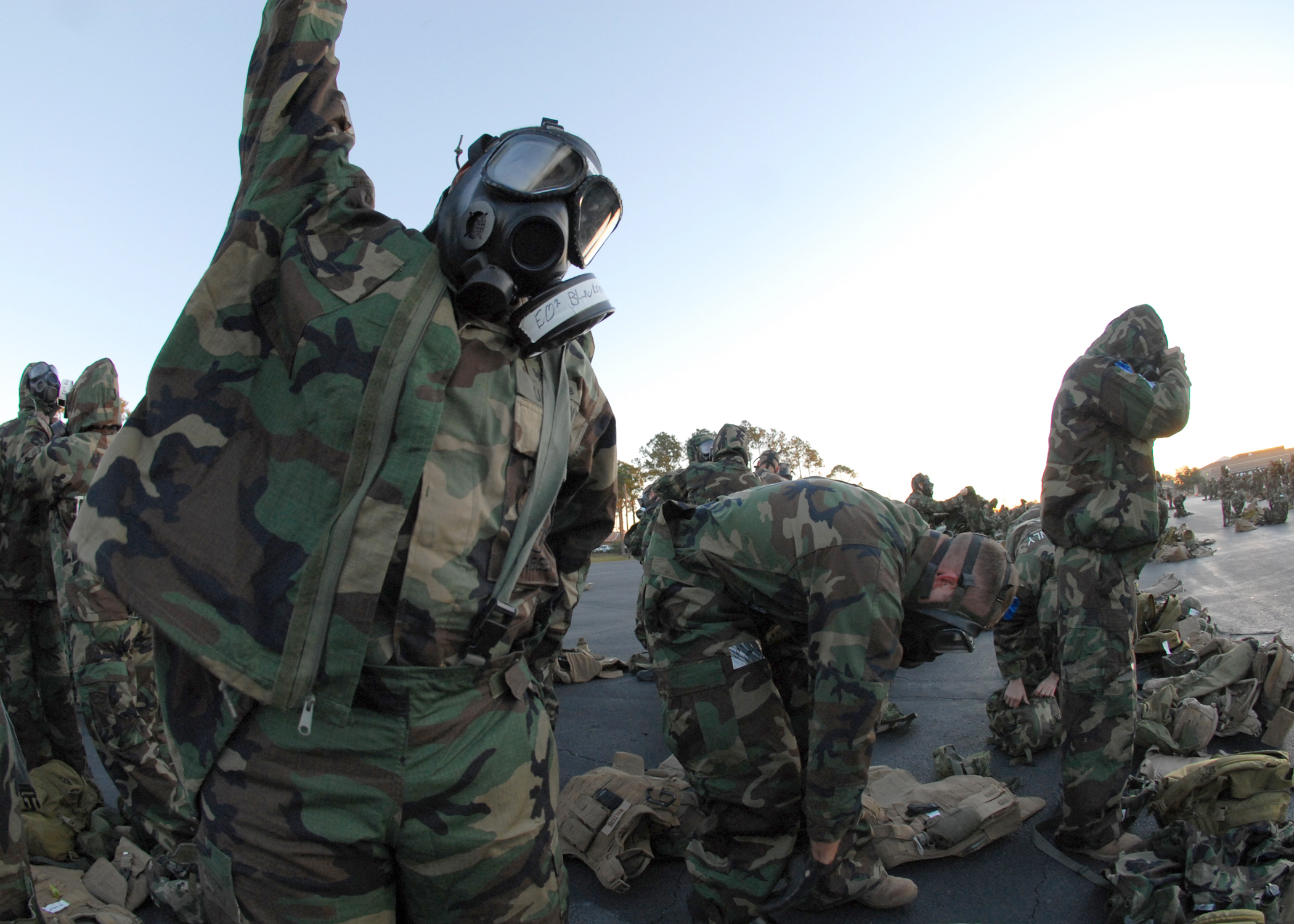
United States Navy Seabees donning NBC suits during a CBRN defense drill in 2008

Radiological warfare is any form of warfare involving deliberate radiation poisoning or contamination of an area with radioisotopes, but without the use of nuclear weapons. While radiological weapons were researched and in some cases tested during the Cold War, there is no evidence any military has ever deployed operational radiological weapons, although they have been used for assassination.

Nuclear warfare, both via fission and fusion weapons, creates radioisotopes in the form of fission products and neutron-activated surface material. This fallout is incorporated into military planning. Neutron bombs are designed to maximize the lethal radiation area and minimize the blast. These uses are generally not considered direct radiological warfare, but salted bombs, which maximize radioisotope production in a nuclear blast area.

Radiological weapons are normally classified as weapons of mass destruction (WMDs), with delivery methods explored including aerial dispersal and missile warheads. They can also be targeted at individuals, such as the assassination of Alexander Litvinenko by the Russian FSB, using radioactive polonium-210.

Numerous countries have expressed an interest in radiological weapons programs, several have actively pursued them. Radiological weapons have been tested in the United States, Soviet Union, Ba'athist Iraq, Israel, and China. Some evidence also exists that Egypt and North Korea pursued radiological weapons.

The United States and Soviet Union during the 1980s jointly attempted to promulgate a comprehensive prohibition treaty on radiological weapons via the Committee on Disarmament, but negotiations stalled over the prohibition of attacks on nuclear facilities, in the wake of the 1981 Israeli bombing of an Iraqi nuclear reactor.

== History ==
=== Early development ===
The first high-activity radioactive material suitable for radiological warfare was produced in the reactor spent fuel of the Hanford Site, during the Manhattan Project. Over two months prior to the Trinity test, a calibration test was carried out using an assembly similar to a dirty bomb. On May 7, 1945, 108 tons of explosives dispersed a single slug irradiated at the Hanford Site to over 1,400 curies.

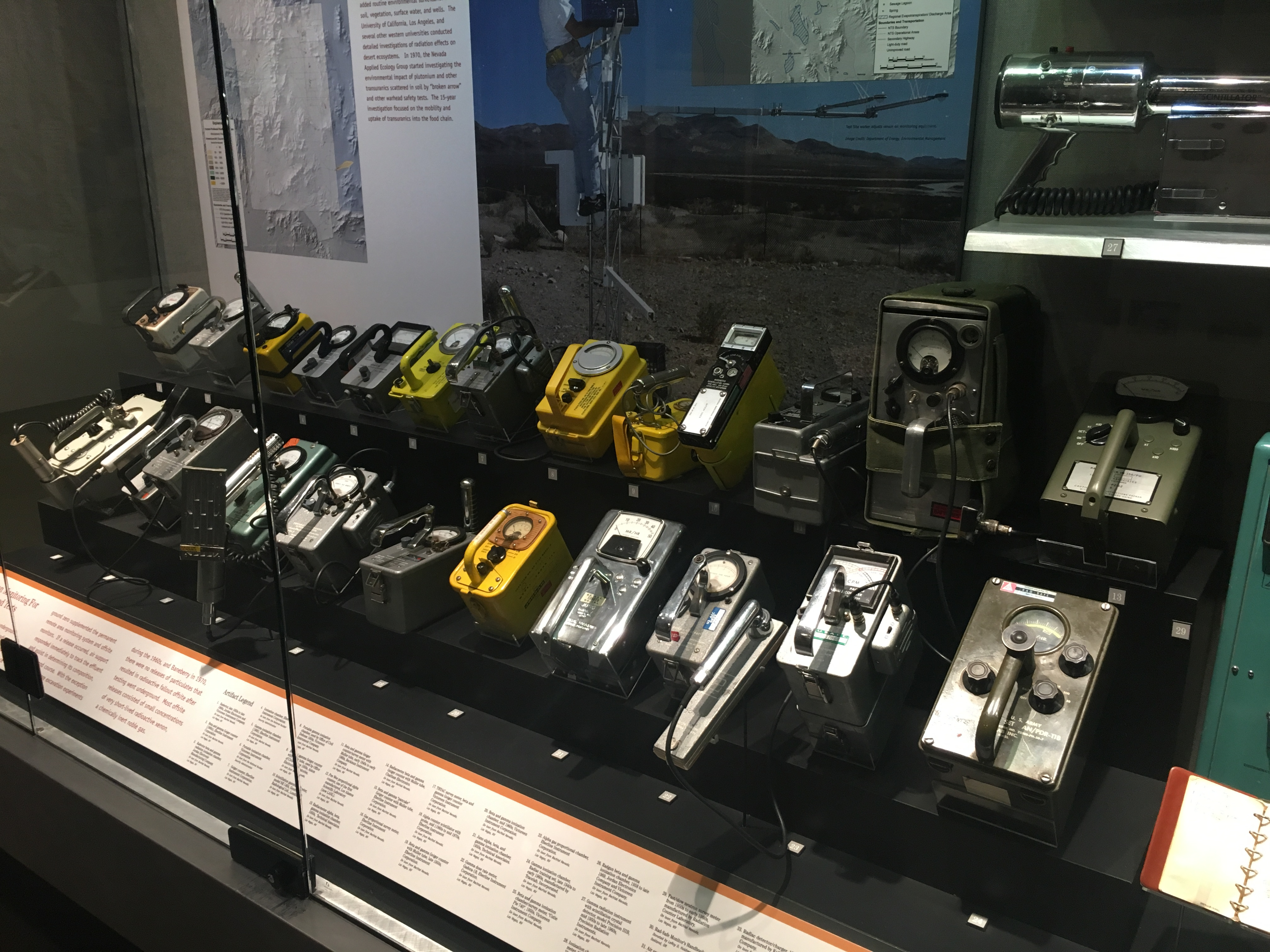
Geiger counter collection, including those designed to pre-empt Nazi German radiological warfare during Operation Peppermint.

Prior to the Normandy landings, members of the Manhattan Project anticipated a risk that the German nuclear program had operational reactors and would use plutonium isotopes or fission products from the spent fuel as a radiological weapon. The Supreme Headquarters Allied Expeditionary Force authorized Operation Peppermint, to develop and distribute Geiger counters, film packets, and other radiation survey meters to detect radiological warfare.

The United States pursued research into an offensive radiological weapons program in the post-war period. Supporters included Ernest Lawrence and Edward Teller. Zirconium and niobium radioisotope fission products were originally considered, but tantalum-182 was concluded to be most effective. Inherently, a radiological weapons stockpile requires constant operation of production reactors, to replenish the rapidly decaying weapon material. This came into conflict with the infrastructure requirements of the emerging nuclear industrial complex, which was demanding all US production reactor capacity for plutonium, but especially the short half-life polonium-210, at the time crucial for neutron initiators.

== Salted nuclear weapons ==
A salted bomb is a nuclear weapon that is equipped with a large quantity of radiologically inert salting material. The radiological warfare agents (ie. radioisotopes) are produced through neutron capture by the salting materials of the neutron radiation emitted by the nuclear weapon. This avoids the problems of having to stockpile the highly radioactive material, as it is produced when the bomb explodes. The result is a more intense fallout than from regular nuclear weapons and can render an area uninhabitable for a long period.

The cobalt bomb is an example of a radiological warfare weapon, where cobalt-59 is converted to cobalt-60 by neutron capture. Initially, gamma radiation of the nuclear fission products from an equivalent sized "clean" fission-fusion-fission bomb (assuming the amount of radioactive dust particles generated are equal) are much more intense than cobalt-60: 15,000 times more intense at 1 hour; 35 times more intense at 1 week; 5 times more intense at 1 month; and about equal at 6 months. Thereafter fission drops off rapidly so that cobalt-60 fallout is 8 times more intense than fission at 1 year and 150 times more intense at 5 years. The very long-lived isotopes produced by fission would overtake the cobalt-60 again after about 75 years.

Other salted bomb variants that do not use cobalt have also been theorized. For example, salting with sodium-23, that transmutes to sodium-24, which because of its 15-hour half-life results in intense radiation.

== Surface-burst nuclear weapons ==
An air burst is preferred if the effects of thermal radiation and blast wave is to be maximized for an area (i.e. area covered by direct line of sight and sufficient luminosity to cause burning, and formation of mach stem respectively). Both fission and fusion weapons will irradiate the detonation site with neutron radiation, causing neutron activation of the material there. Fission and fusion weapons (which derive most of their energy from fission reactions) release fission product fallout, which if the bomb is air burst will be dispersed globally. Air will not form isotopes useful for radiological warfare when neutron-activated. By detonating them at or near the surface instead, in a ground burst, the ground will be vaporized, become radioactive, and when it cools down and condenses into particles cause significant fallout.

== Dirty bombs ==
A far lower-tech radiological weapon than those discussed above is a "dirty bomb" or radiological dispersal device, whose purpose is to disperse radioactive dust over an area. The release of radioactive material may involve no special "weapon" or side forces like a blast explosion and include no direct killing of people from its radiation source, but rather could make whole areas or structures unusable or unfavorable for the support of human life. The radioactive material may be dispersed slowly over a large area, and it can be difficult for the victims to initially know that such a radiological attack is being carried out, especially if detectors for radioactivity are not installed beforehand.

Radiological warfare with dirty bombs could be used for nuclear terrorism, spreading or intensifying fear. In relation to these weapons, nation states can also spread rumor, disinformation and fear.

== Radiological assassination ==
The death of British-naturalized Russian defector Alexander Litvinenko in London is widely believed to be assassination via polonium poisoning and on the order of the Russian FSB. Polonium is also suspected as the cause of death for Yasser Arafat, Yuri Shchekochikhin, Lecha Islamov and Roman Tsepov.

== Attacks on nuclear facilities ==
In 1981, the Israeli Air Force bombed the unfinished Osiraq Nuclear Reactor in Iraq.

In 2007, the Israeli Air Force bombed an unfinished Syrian nuclear reactor at the Al Kibar site.

In July 2023, during Russia’s invasion of Ukraine, Russia was accused of preparing to bomb the Zaporizhzhia nuclear power plant in Ukraine, in order to use the nuclear reactors as dirty bombs.

In June 2025, during the Iran–Israel war, the Israeli Air Force bombed Iranian nuclear facilities including the unfinished Arak heavy water reactor and multiple uranium enrichment sites.

On June 22, 2025, during the Iran–Israel war, the United States Air Force and United States Navy bombed three nuclear facilities in Iran, including uranium enrichment sites.

== See also ==
- Acute radiation syndrome
- Area denial weapons
- Depleted uranium
- Neutron bomb
- Nuclear detection
- Nuclear warfare
- Operation Peppermint
- Scorched earth and "Salting the earth"
- Yasser Arafat § Theories about the cause of death
