= C-bomb =

C-bomb could mean:

- Cobalt bomb - a type of doomsday device.
- Cunt - an English-language profanity which is widely considered to be particularly strong.
- C-bomb (PlayStation Network) - a problem with the PlayStation Network online gaming service
