= Colt Group =

British HVAC business

Colt
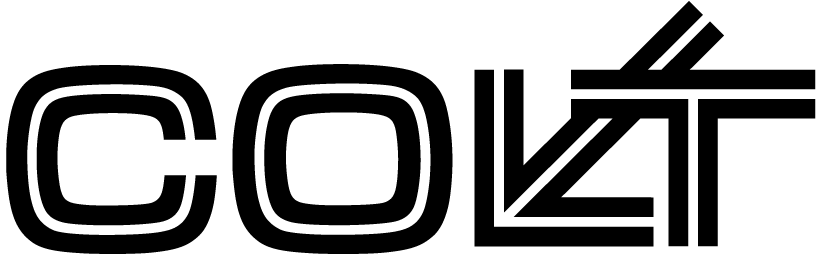
- Founded: 1931 in London
- Founder: Jack O'Hea
- Headquarters: Waterlooville, UK
- Area served: United Kingdom; Netherlands; Germany; Asia; Australia
- Key people: Mark Oliver, CEO
- Services: HVAC control; Smoke control; Natural ventilation; Solar shading; Maintenance
- Revenue: £180 million (2017)
- Number of employees: 1000 (2018)
- Website: colt-info.com

Colt is a company headquartered in Waterlooville, United Kingdom, that designs and supplies HVAC control, smoke control, and brise soleil systems, and services and maintains them. It is family-owned and was founded in 1931 in London.

The company is present in over 75 countries through subsidiaries, license and joint venture agreements. The company has manufacturing sites in the UK, the Netherlands, Germany, Saudi Arabia and China. It has approximately 1000 employees and an annual revenue of £180 million, as of 2017. The company's chief executive officer is Mark Oliver.

== History ==
Colt was founded in 1931 by Jack O'Hea in London. In the 1930s the company's principal business activity was developing ventilators for industry. During the Second World War, Colt developed a series of blackout ventilators to ensure ventilation could take place in blacked-out buildings. In 1945 the UK Government started a massive rehousing programme using prefabricated houses. These houses were designed without fireplaces to save space, which created the need for an alternative source of ventilation. Colt designed the Constant Flow ventilator to meet this need. The post-war years also saw the reconstruction of the British manufacturing industry and the erection of new factory buildings across the country. At that time, Colt designed the Sloping Roof ventilator, which lay along the roof slope, reducing installation and maintenance costs. The company also designed the Clear Opening ventilator for industrial buildings such as foundries. The design ensured cooler working conditions and daylighting inside factories. In the 1950s, the advent of large single-storey industrial buildings in the automotive sector required a new approach to fire safety. In 1954 Colt designed and installed the world's first smoke ventilation system at the Vauxhall factory in Luton, UK. The company has since sponsored and participated in research programmes for smoke control.

In the 1960s Colt began to expand operations to continental Europe, initially through a joint venture in the Netherlands. In the following decades the company continued to expand into new markets. In 1978 the O'Hea family gave Colt shares to establish the Colt Foundation, a registered charity that funds research projects in the field of occupational and environmental health, especially those aimed at discovering the causes of illnesses arising from conditions in the workplace. In its first 33 years of operation it awarded more than £13.5 million in grants to over 200 projects and supported around 220 students. In the 1980s Colt adapted its ventilation products to commercial buildings and entered the solar shading market. In the 1990s the company invested in research on daylighting and solar power. This led to the design of the Shadovoltaic, a combined solar shading, daylighting and electricity generating system for building façades and roofs. In 1990 Colt designed, built and installed the steel pyramid on top of One Canada Square in Canary Wharf, London.

In 2007 Colt purchased Bomin Solar, a company specialising in sunshading and daylighting systems. Colt participated in the design of the world's first microalgae-based bioreactor façade. Its installation at the BIQ House at the International Building Exhibition in Hamburg, Germany was completed on 23 March 2013. The façade is part of a pilot project resulting from three years of research and development by Colt, based on a concept developed by SSC Ltd and designed by Arup Group, with funding from the German Government's Zukunft Bau ('Future of Construction') research initiative. The photobioreactive façade won the Zumtobel Group Award 2014 in the Applied Innovations category. In 2014 Colt expanded its range of evaporative cooling systems with the launch of a rooftop unit that combines cooling, heating, heat recovery, air filtration and ventilation. The company also invested in increasing production efficiency at its manufacturing facility in China, and expanded the range of products manufactured there.

== Awards ==
- Red Dot: Best of the Best Award – 2017 – for the Coltlite ventilator.
- BAKA Low Energy Systems Award – 2015 – for the ClimaTower.
- Zumtobel Group Award – Applied Innovations – 2014 for Colt's bioreactor façade
- RoSPA President's Award – 2014 – Royal Society for the Prevention of Accidents (RoSPA) award in recognition of Colt having won the RoSPA Gold Medal Award for 10 consecutive years.

== Products and services ==
- Smoke control (including fire ventilation, smoke extraction, car park, corridor, and staircase ventilation, pressurisation systems, and smoke containment)
- HVAC control (including HVAC systems and acoustic louvres)
- Natural ventilation
- Solar shading (including sun protection, glass, and aluminium louvres, and brise soleil)
- Cladding and performance louvres
- Design support and project management
- Servicing and maintenance
- Training
