= Smoke =

Mass of airborne particulates and gases

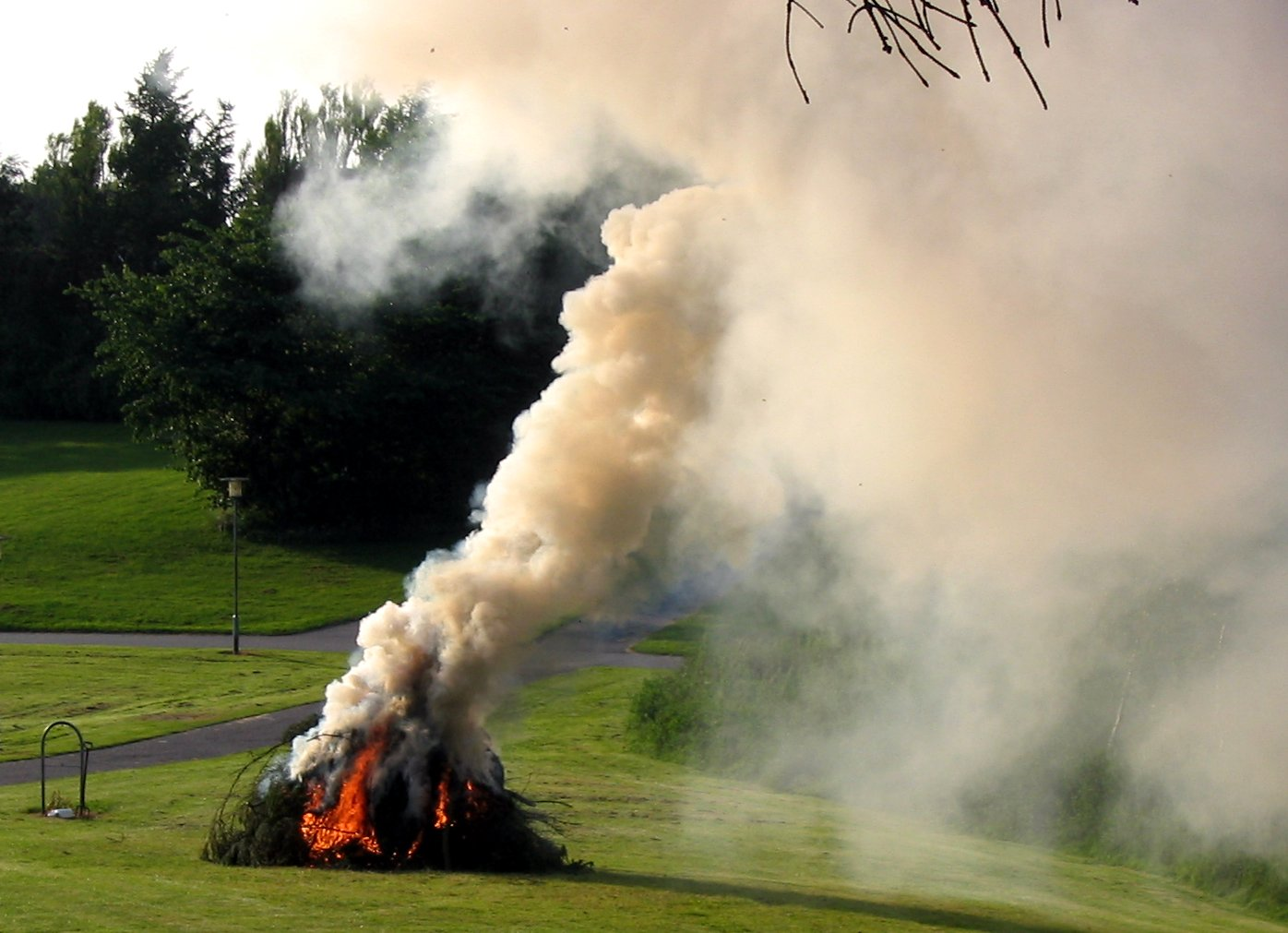
Smoke from a fire

Billowing smoke at Takaosan Yakuoin Temple firewalking festival in Japan, 2016

Smoke is an aerosol (a suspension of particulates in gases) emitted when a material undergoes combustion or pyrolysis, together with the quantity of air that is entrained or otherwise mixed into the mass. It is commonly an unwanted by-product of fires (including stoves, candles, internal combustion engines, oil lamps, and fireplaces), but may also be used for pest control (fumigation), communication (smoke signals), defensive and offensive capabilities in the military (smoke screen), cooking, or smoking (tobacco, cannabis, etc.). It is used in rituals where incense, sage, or resin is burned to produce a smell for spiritual or magical purposes. It can also be a flavoring agent and preservative.

Smoke inhalation is the primary cause of death in victims of indoor fires. The smoke kills by a combination of thermal damage, poisoning and pulmonary irritation caused by carbon monoxide, hydrogen cyanide and other combustion products.

Smoke is an aerosol (or mist) of solid particles and liquid droplets that are close to the ideal range of sizes for Mie scattering of visible light.

== Chemical composition ==
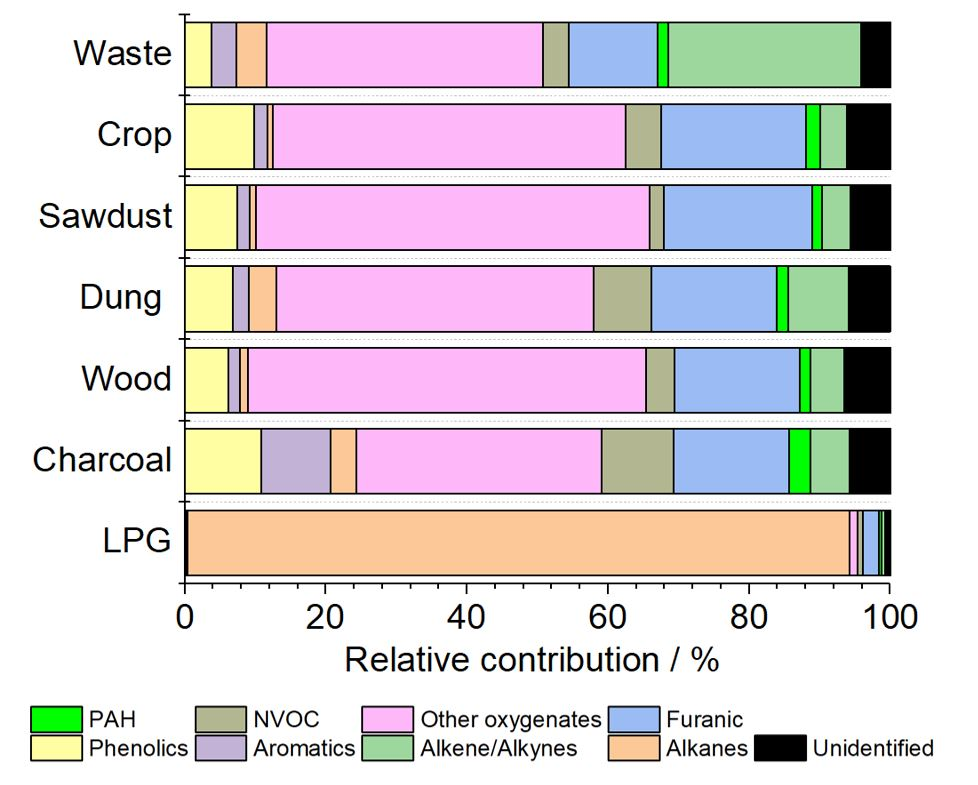
Chemical composition distribution of volatile organic compounds released in smoke from a variety of solid fuels

The composition of smoke depends on the nature of the burning fuel and the conditions of combustion. Fires with high availability of oxygen burn at a high temperature and with a small amount of smoke produced; the particles are mostly composed of ash, or with large temperature differences, of condensed aerosol of water. High temperature also leads to production of nitrogen oxides. Sulfur content yields sulfur dioxide, or in case of incomplete combustion, hydrogen sulfide. Carbon and hydrogen are almost completely oxidized to carbon dioxide and water. Fires burning with lack of oxygen produce a significantly wider palette of compounds, many of them toxic. Partial oxidation of carbon produces carbon monoxide, while nitrogen-containing materials can yield hydrogen cyanide, ammonia, and nitrogen oxides. Hydrogen gas can be produced instead of water. Contents of halogens such as chlorine (e.g. in polyvinyl chloride or brominated flame retardants) may lead to the production of hydrogen chloride, phosgene, dioxin, and chloromethane, bromomethane and other halocarbons. Hydrogen fluoride can be formed from fluorocarbons, whether fluoropolymers subjected to fire or halocarbon fire suppression agents. Phosphorus and antimony oxides and their reaction products can be formed from some fire retardant additives, increasing smoke toxicity and corrosivity. Pyrolysis of polychlorinated biphenyls (PCB), e.g. from burning older transformer oil, and to lower degree also of other chlorine-containing materials, can produce 2,3,7,8-tetrachlorodibenzodioxin, a potent carcinogen, and other polychlorinated dibenzodioxins. Pyrolysis of fluoropolymers, e.g. teflon, in presence of oxygen yields carbonyl fluoride (which hydrolyzes readily to HF and CO_{2}); other compounds may be formed as well, e.g. carbon tetrafluoride, hexafluoropropylene, and highly toxic perfluoroisobutene (PFIB).

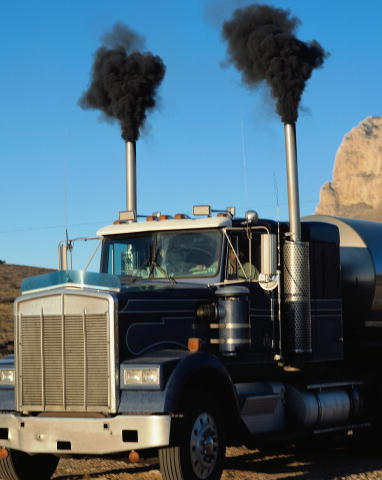
Emission of soot in the fumes of a large diesel truck, without particle filters

Pyrolysis of burning material, especially incomplete combustion or smoldering without adequate oxygen supply, also results in production of a large amount of hydrocarbons, both aliphatic (methane, ethane, ethylene, acetylene) and aromatic (benzene and its derivates, polycyclic aromatic hydrocarbons; e.g. benzo[a]pyrene, studied as a carcinogen, or retene), terpenes. It also results in the emission of a range of smaller oxygenated volatile organic compounds (methanol, acetic acid, hydroxy acetone, methyl acetate and ethyl formate) which are formed as combustion by products as well as less volatile oxygenated organic species such as phenolics, furans and furanones. Heterocyclic compounds may be also present. Heavier hydrocarbons may condense as tar; smoke with significant tar content is yellow to brown. Combustion of solid fuels can result in the emission of many hundreds to thousands of lower volatility organic compounds in the aerosol phase. Presence of such smoke, soot, and/or brown oily deposits during a fire indicates a possible hazardous situation, as the atmosphere may be saturated with combustible pyrolysis products with concentration above the upper flammability limit, and sudden inrush of air can cause flashover or backdraft.

Presence of sulfur can lead to formation of gases like hydrogen sulfide, carbonyl sulfide, sulfur dioxide, carbon disulfide, and thiols; especially thiols tend to get adsorbed on surfaces and produce a lingering odor even long after the fire. Partial oxidation of the released hydrocarbons yields in a wide palette of other compounds: aldehydes (e.g. formaldehyde, acrolein, and furfural), ketones, alcohols (often aromatic, e.g. phenol, guaiacol, syringol, catechol, and cresols), carboxylic acids (formic acid, acetic acid, etc.).

The visible particulate matter in such smokes is most commonly composed of carbon (soot). Other particulates may be composed of drops of condensed tar, or solid particles of ash. The presence of metals in the fuel yields particles of metal oxides. Particles of inorganic salts may also be formed, e.g. ammonium sulfate, ammonium nitrate, or sodium chloride. Inorganic salts present on the surface of the soot particles may make them hydrophilic. Many organic compounds, typically the aromatic hydrocarbons, may be also adsorbed on the surface of the solid particles. Metal oxides can be present when metal-containing fuels are burned, e.g. solid rocket fuels containing aluminium. Depleted uranium projectiles after impacting the target ignite, producing particles of uranium oxides. Magnetic particles, spherules of magnetite-like ferrous ferric oxide, are present in coal smoke; their increase in deposits after 1860 marks the beginning of the Industrial Revolution. (Magnetic iron oxide nanoparticles can be also produced in the smoke from meteorites burning in the atmosphere.) Magnetic remanence, recorded in the iron oxide particles, indicates the strength of Earth's magnetic field when they were cooled beyond their Curie temperature; this can be used to distinguish magnetic particles of terrestrial and meteoric origin. Fly ash is composed mainly of silica and calcium oxide. Cenospheres are present in smoke from liquid hydrocarbon fuels. Minute metal particles produced by abrasion can be present in engine smokes. Amorphous silica particles are present in smokes from burning silicones; small proportion of silicon nitride particles can be formed in fires with insufficient oxygen. The silica particles have about 10 nm size, clumped to 70–100 nm aggregates and further agglomerated to chains. Radioactive particles may be present due to traces of uranium, thorium, or other radionuclides in the fuel; hot particles can be present in case of fires during nuclear accidents (e.g. Chernobyl disaster) or nuclear war.

Smoke particulates, like other aerosols, are categorized into three modes based on particle size:

- nuclei mode, with geometric mean radius between 2.5 and 20 nm, likely forming by condensation of carbon moieties.
- accumulation mode, ranging between 75 and 250 nm and formed by coagulation of nuclei mode particles
- coarse mode, with particles in micrometer range

Most of the smoke material is primarily in coarse particles. Those undergo rapid dry precipitation, and the smoke damage in more distant areas outside of the room where the fire occurs is therefore primarily mediated by the smaller particles.

Aerosol of particles beyond visible size is an early indicator of materials in a preignition stage of a fire.

Burning of hydrogen-rich fuel produces water vapor; this results in smoke containing droplets of water. In absence of other color sources (nitrogen oxides, particulates...), such smoke is white and cloud-like.

Smoke emissions may contain characteristic trace elements. Vanadium is present in emissions from oil fired power plants and refineries; oil plants also emit some nickel. Coal combustion produces emissions containing aluminium, arsenic, chromium, cobalt, copper, iron, mercury, selenium, and uranium.

Traces of vanadium in high-temperature combustion products form droplets of molten vanadates. These attack the passivation layers on metals and cause high temperature corrosion, which is a concern especially for internal combustion engines. Molten sulfate and lead particulates also have such effect.

Some components of smoke are characteristic of the combustion source. Guaiacol and its derivatives are products of pyrolysis of lignin and are characteristic of wood smoke; other markers are syringol and derivates, and other methoxy phenols. Retene, a product of pyrolysis of conifer trees, is an indicator of forest fires. Levoglucosan is a pyrolysis product of cellulose. Hardwood vs softwood smokes differ in the ratio of guaiacols/syringols. Markers for vehicle exhaust include polycyclic aromatic hydrocarbons, hopanes, steranes, and specific nitroarenes (e.g. 1-nitropyrene). The ratio of hopanes and steranes to elemental carbon can be used to distinguish between emissions of gasoline and diesel engines.

Many compounds can be associated with particulates; whether by being adsorbed on their surfaces, or by being dissolved in liquid droplets. Hydrogen chloride is well absorbed in the soot particles.

Inert particulate matter can be disturbed and entrained into the smoke. Of particular concern are particles of asbestos.

Deposited hot particles of radioactive fallout and bioaccumulated radioisotopes can be reintroduced into the atmosphere by wildfires and forest fires; this is a concern in e.g. the Zone of alienation containing contaminants from the Chernobyl disaster.

Polymers are a significant source of smoke. Aromatic side groups, e.g. in polystyrene, enhance generation of smoke. Aromatic groups integrated in the polymer backbone produce less smoke, likely due to significant charring. Aliphatic polymers tend to generate the least smoke, and are non-self-extinguishing. However presence of additives can significantly increase smoke formation. Phosphorus-based and halogen-based flame retardants decrease production of smoke. Higher degree of cross-linking between the polymer chains has such effect too.

=== Visible and invisible particles of combustion ===
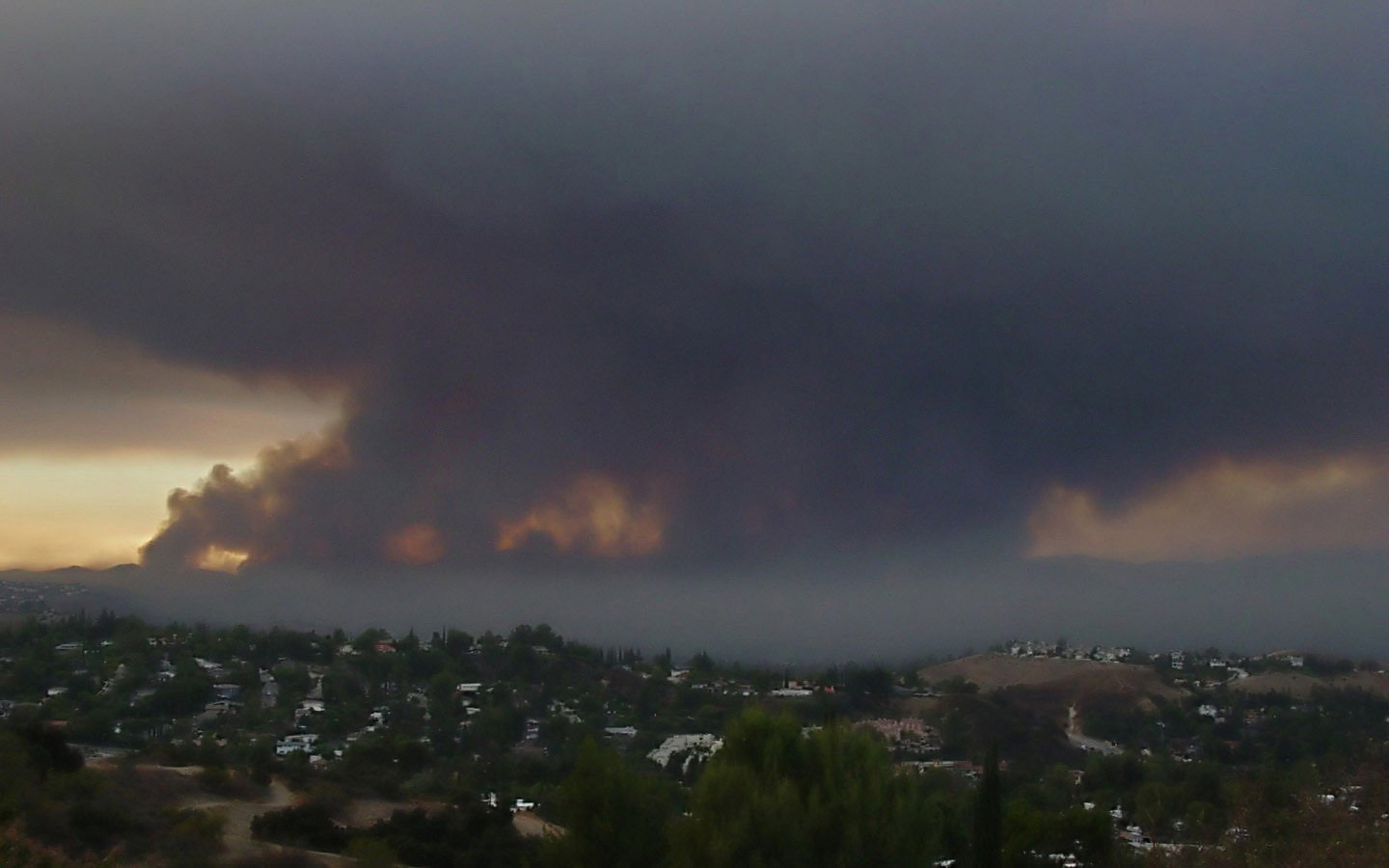
Smoke from a wildfire

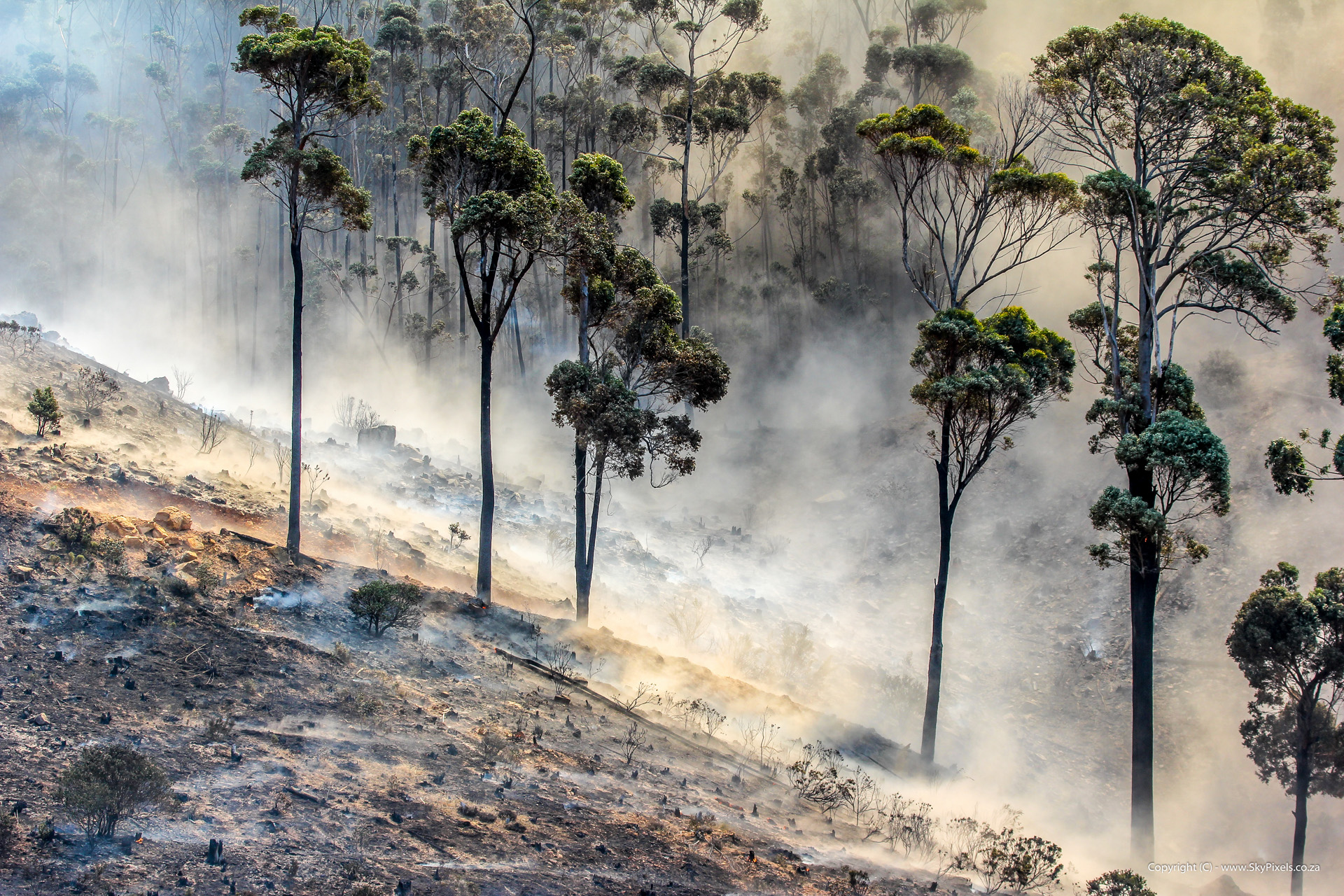
Smoke rising up from the smoldering remains of a recently extingished mountain fire in South Africa

The naked eye detects particle sizes greater than 7 μm (micrometres). Visible particles emitted from a fire are referred to as smoke. Invisible particles are generally referred to as gas or fumes. This is best illustrated when toasting bread in a toaster. As the bread heats up, the products of combustion increase in size. The fumes initially produced are invisible but become visible if the toast is burnt.

An ionization chamber type smoke detector is technically a product of combustion detector, not a smoke detector. Ionization chamber type smoke detectors detect particles of combustion that are invisible to the naked eye. This explains why they may frequently false alarm from the fumes emitted from the red-hot heating elements of a toaster, before the presence of visible smoke, yet they may fail to activate in the early, low-heat smoldering stage of a fire.

Smoke from a typical house fire contains hundreds of different chemicals and fumes. As a result, the damage caused by the smoke can often exceed that caused by the actual heat of the fire. In addition to the physical damage caused by the smoke of a fire – which manifests itself in the form of stains – is the often even harder to eliminate problem of a smoky odor.

== Dangers ==
Smoke from oxygen-deprived fires contains a significant concentration of compounds that are flammable. A cloud of smoke, in contact with atmospheric oxygen, therefore has the potential of being ignited – either by another open flame in the area, or by its own temperature. This leads to effects like backdraft and flashover. Smoke inhalation is also a danger of smoke that can cause serious injury and death.

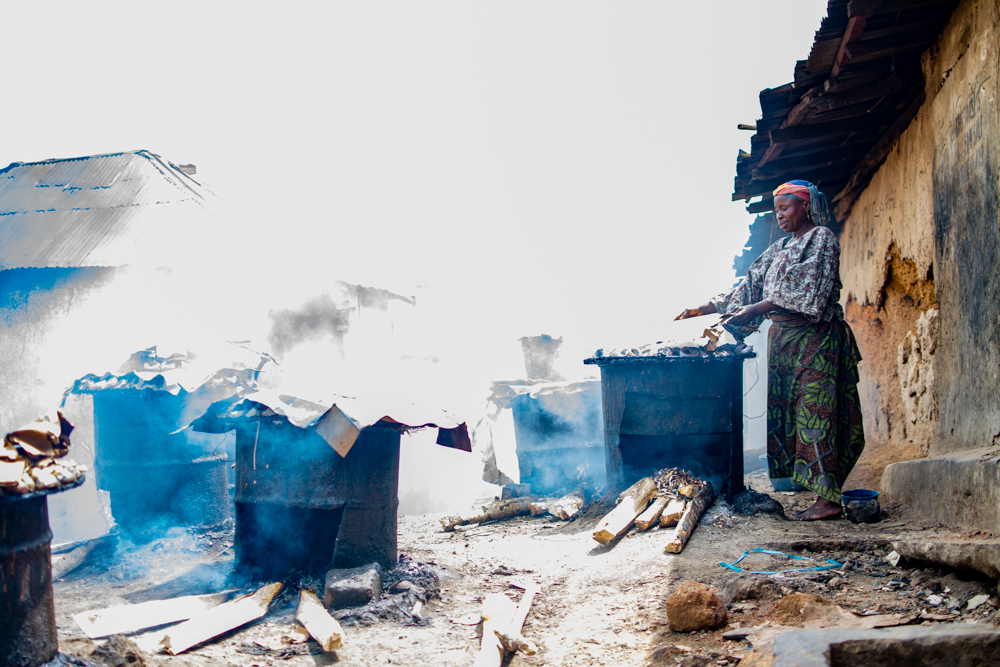
Processing fish while being exposed to smoke

Many compounds of smoke from fires are highly toxic and/or irritating. The most dangerous is carbon monoxide leading to carbon monoxide poisoning, sometimes with the additive effects of hydrogen cyanide and phosgene. Smoke inhalation can therefore quickly lead to incapacitation and loss of consciousness. Sulfur oxides, hydrogen chloride and hydrogen fluoride in contact with moisture form sulfuric, hydrochloric and hydrofluoric acid, which are corrosive to both lungs and materials.

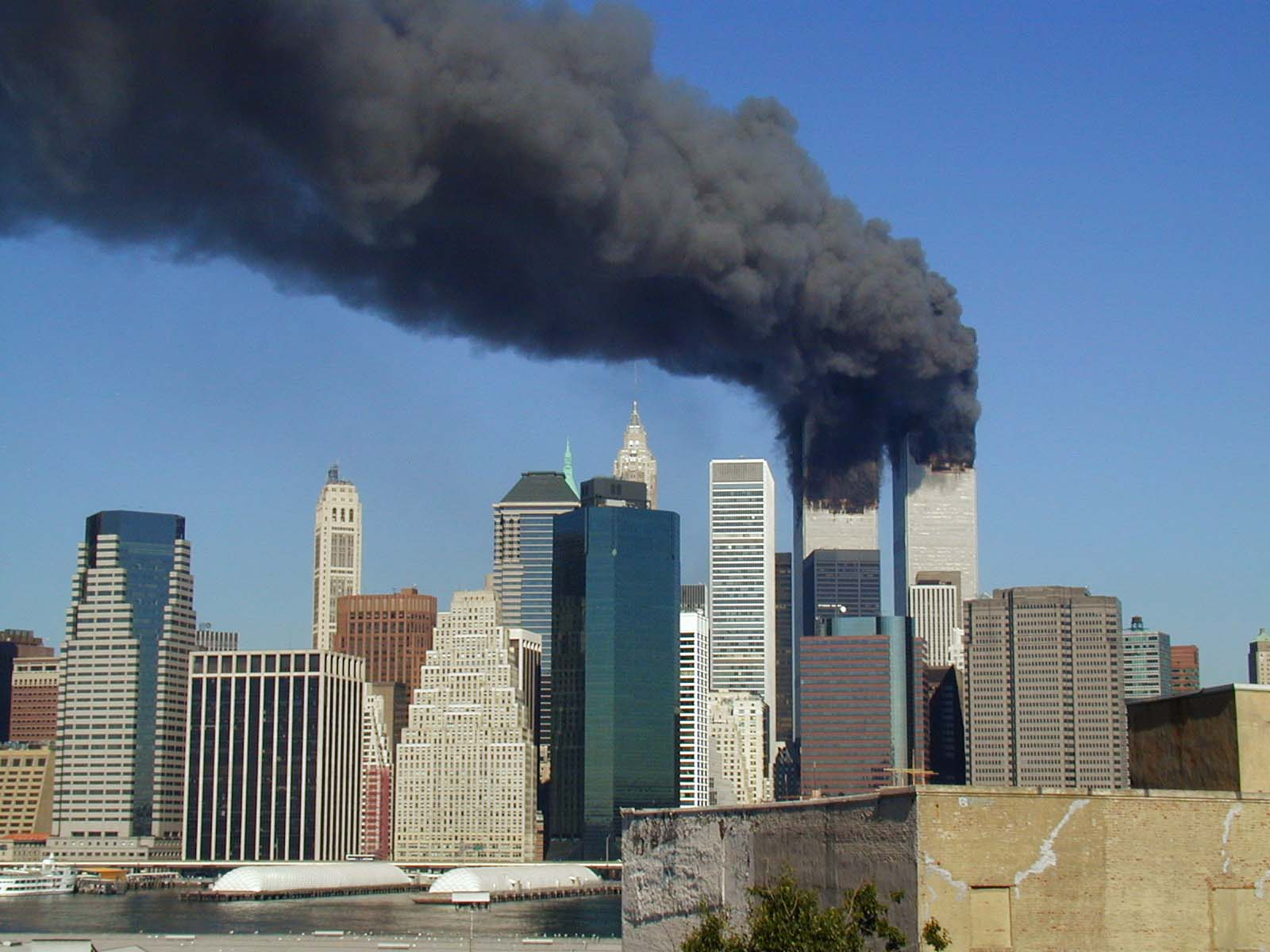
World Trade Center on fire after terrorists flew planes into the buildings on September 11, 2001

Cigarette smoke is a major modifiable risk factor for lung disease, heart disease, and many cancers. Smoke can also be a component of ambient air pollution due to the burning of coal in power plants, forest fires or other sources, although the concentration of pollutants in ambient air is typically much less than that in cigarette smoke. One day of exposure to PM2.5 at a concentration of 880 μg/m^{3}, such as occurs in Beijing, China, is the equivalent of smoking one or two cigarettes in terms of particulate inhalation by weight. The analysis is complicated, however, by the fact that the organic compounds present in various ambient particulates may have a higher carcinogenicity than the compounds in cigarette smoke particulates. Secondhand tobacco smoke is the combination of both sidestream and mainstream smoke emissions from a burning tobacco product. These emissions contain more than 50 carcinogenic chemicals. According to the United States Surgeon General's 2006 report on the subject, exposure to secondhand tobacco smoke can activate platelets causing increased clotting and increased risk of thrombus and potentially damage the lining of blood vessels, decrease coronary flow velocity reserves, and reduce heart rate variability, potentially increasing the risk of a heart attack. The chances of these effects occurring increase with increased exposure and time of exposure. The American Cancer Society lists "heart disease, lung infections, increased asthma attacks, middle ear infections, and low birth weight" as ramifications of exposure to secondhand smoke.

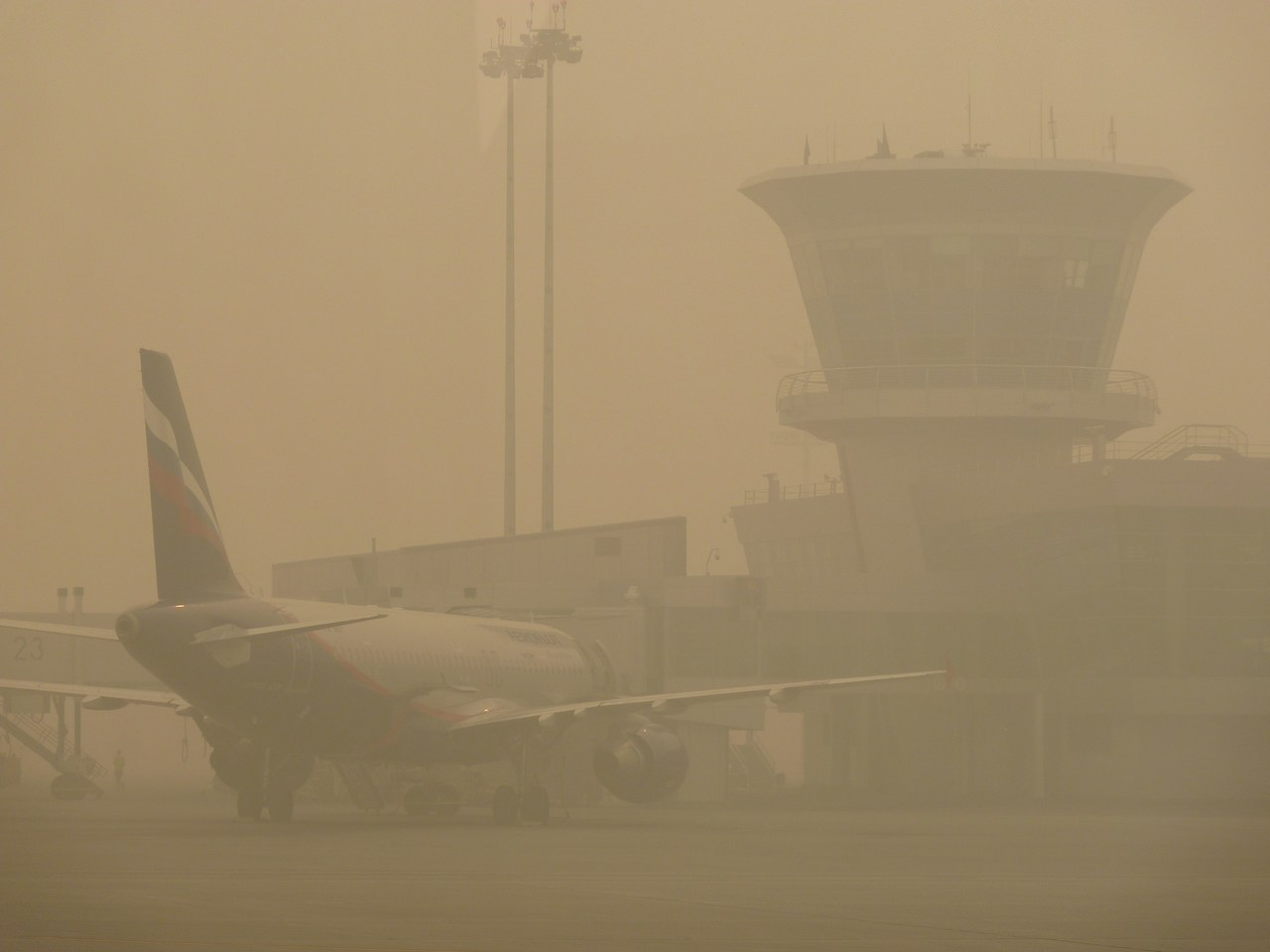
Reduced visibility due to wildfire smoke in Sheremetyevo Airport, Moscow, 7 August 2010

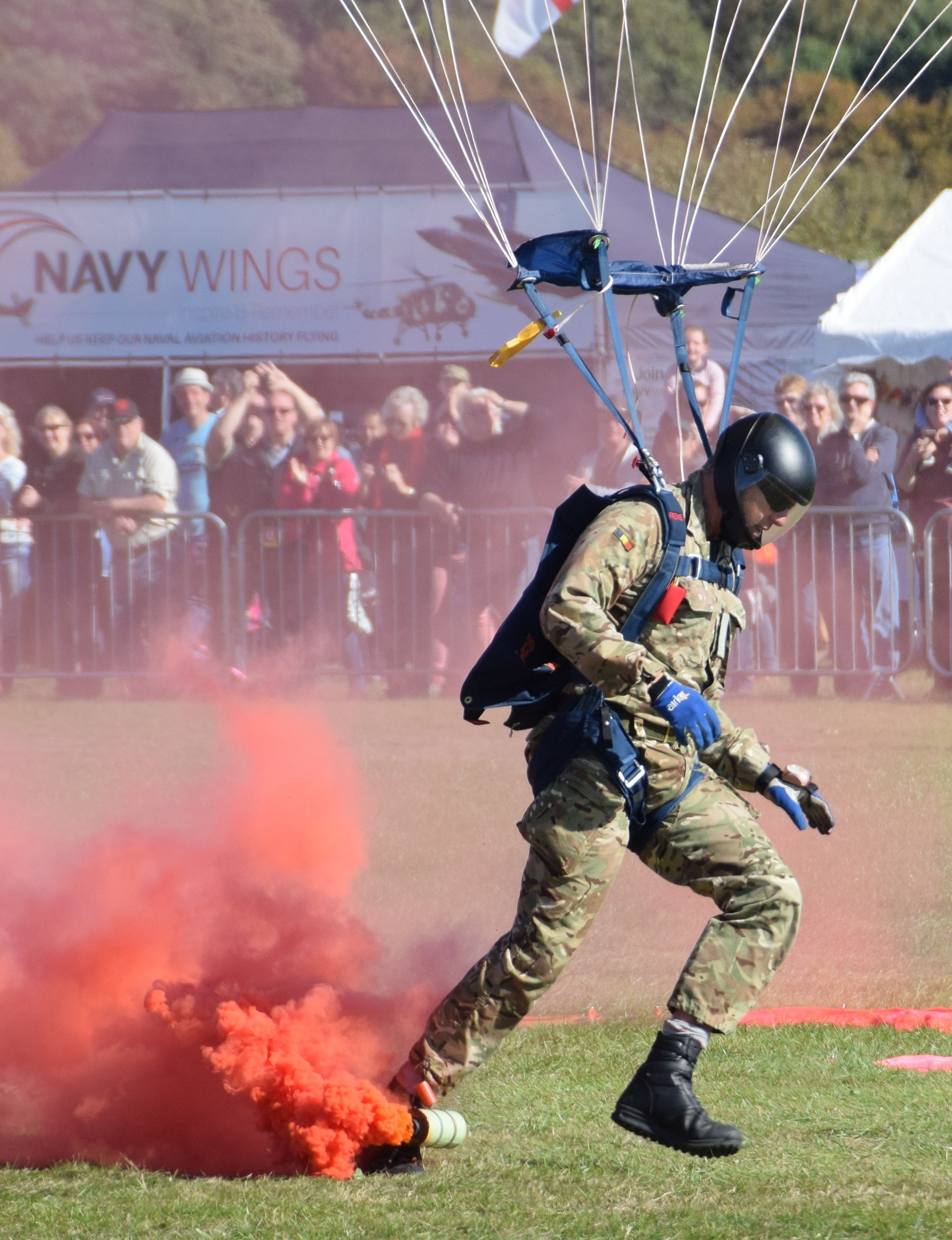
Red smoke carried by a parachutist of the UK Lightning Bolts Army Parachute Display Team

Smoke can obscure visibility, impeding occupant exiting from fire areas. In fact, the poor visibility due to the smoke that was in the Worcester Cold Storage Warehouse fire in Worcester, Massachusetts was the reason why the trapped rescue firefighters could not evacuate the building in time. Because of the striking similarity that each floor shared, the dense smoke caused the firefighters to become disoriented.

=== Corrosion ===
Smoke can contain a wide variety of chemicals, many of them aggressive in nature. Examples are hydrochloric acid and hydrobromic acid, produced from halogen-containing plastics and fire retardants, hydrofluoric acid released by pyrolysis of fluorocarbon fire suppression agents, sulfuric acid from burning of sulfur-containing materials, nitric acid from high-temperature fires where nitrous oxide gets formed, phosphoric acid and antimony compounds from P and Sb based fire retardants, and many others. Such corrosion is not significant for structural materials, but delicate structures, especially microelectronics, are strongly affected. Corrosion of circuit board traces, penetration of aggressive chemicals through the casings of parts, and other effects can cause an immediate or gradual deterioration of parameters or even premature (and often delayed, as the corrosion can progress over long time) failure of equipment subjected to smoke. Many smoke components are also electrically conductive; deposition of a conductive layer on the circuits can cause crosstalks and other deteriorations of the operating parameters or even cause short circuits and total failures. Electrical contacts can be affected by corrosion of surfaces, and by deposition of soot and other conductive particles or nonconductive layers on or across the contacts. Deposited particles may adversely affect the performance of optoelectronics by absorbing or scattering the light beams.

Corrosivity of smoke produced by materials is characterized by the corrosion index (CI), defined as material loss rate (angstrom/minute) per amount of material gasified products (grams) per volume of air (m^{3}). It is measured by exposing strips of metal to flow of combustion products in a test tunnel. Polymers containing halogen and hydrogen (polyvinyl chloride, polyolefins with halogenated additives, etc.) have the highest CI as the corrosive acids are formed directly with water produced by the combustion, polymers containing halogen only (e.g. polytetrafluoroethylene) have lower CI as the formation of acid is limited to reactions with airborne humidity, and halogen-free materials (polyolefins, wood) have the lowest CI. However, some halogen-free materials can also release significant amount of corrosive products.

Smoke damage to electronic equipment can be significantly more extensive than the fire itself. Cable fires are of special concern; low smoke zero halogen materials are preferable for cable insulation.

When smoke comes into contact with the surface of any substance or structure, the chemicals contained in it are transferred to it. The corrosive properties of the chemicals cause the substance or structure to decompose at a rapid rate. Certain materials or structures absorb these chemicals, which is why clothing, unsealed surfaces, potable water, piping, wood, etc., are replaced in most cases of structural fires.

=== Health effects of wood smoke ===
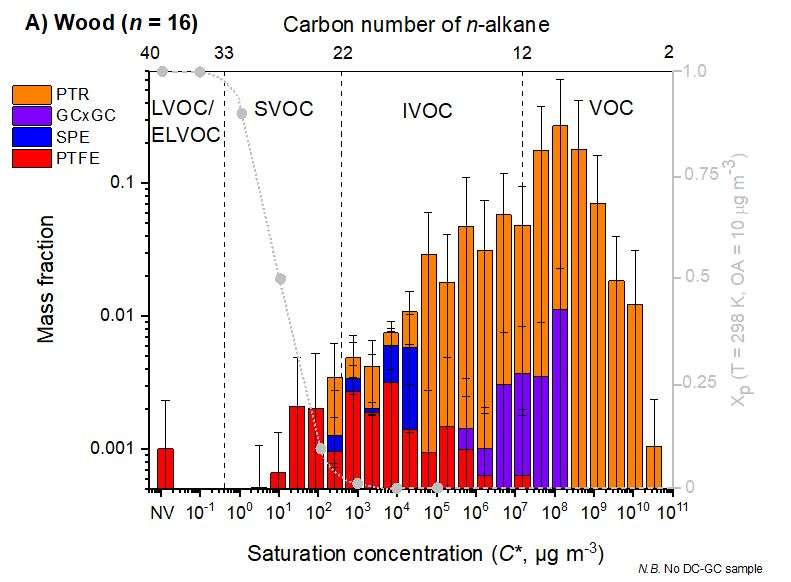
Volatility distribution of volatile organic compound emissions in wood smoke

Wood smoke is a major source of air pollution, especially particulate pollution, pollution by polycyclic aromatic hydrocarbons (PAHs) and volatile organic compounds (VOCs) such as formaldehyde.

In the United Kingdom domestic combustion, especially for industrial uses, is the largest single source of PM2.5 annually. In some towns and cities in New South Wales, wood smoke may be responsible for 60% of fine particle air pollution in the winter. A year-long sampling campaign in Athens, Greece found a third (31%) of PAH urban air pollution to be caused by wood-burning, roughly as much as that of diesel and oil (33%) and gasoline (29%). It also found that wood-burning is responsible for nearly half (43%) of annual PAH lung cancer-risk compared to the other sources and that wintertime PAH levels were 7 times higher than in other seasons, presumably due to an increased use of fireplaces and heaters. The largest exposure events are periods during the winter with reduced atmospheric dispersion to dilute the accumulated pollution, in particular due to the low wind speeds. Research conducted about biomass burning in 2015, estimated that 38% of European total particulate pollution emissions are composed of domestic wood burning.

Wood smoke (for example from wildfires or wood ovens) can cause lung damage, artery damage and DNA damage leading to cancer, other respiratory and lung disease and cardiovascular disease. Air pollution, particulate matter and wood smoke may also cause brain damage because of particulates breaching the cardiovascular system and into the brain, which can increase the risk of developmental disorders, neurodegenerative disorders mental disorders, and suicidal behavior, although studies on the link between depression and some air pollutants are not consistent. At least one study has identified "the abundant presence in the human brain of magnetite nanoparticles that match precisely the high-temperature magnetite nanospheres, formed by combustion and/or friction-derived heating, which are prolific in urban, airborne particulate matter (PM)." Air pollution has also been linked to a range of other psychosocial problems.

== Measurement ==
As early as the 15th century Leonardo da Vinci commented at length on the difficulty of assessing smoke, and distinguished between black smoke (carbonized particles) and white 'smoke' which is not a smoke at all but merely a suspension of harmless water particulates.

Smoke from heating appliances is commonly measured in one of the following ways:

In-line capture. A smoke sample is simply sucked through a filter which is weighed before and after the test and the mass of smoke found. This is the simplest and probably the most accurate method, but can only be used where the smoke concentration is slight, as the filter can quickly become blocked.

The ASTM smoke pump is a simple and widely used method of in-line capture where a measured volume of smoke is pulled through a filter paper and the dark spot so formed is compared with a standard.

Filter/dilution tunnel. A smoke sample is drawn through a tube where it is diluted with air, the resulting smoke/air mixture is then pulled through a filter and weighed. This is the internationally recognized method of measuring smoke from combustion.

Electrostatic precipitation. The smoke is passed through an array of metal tubes which contain suspended wires. A (huge) electrical potential is applied across the tubes and wires so that the smoke particles become charged and are attracted to the sides of the tubes. This method can over-read by capturing harmless condensates, or under-read due to the insulating effect of the smoke. However, it is the necessary method for assessing volumes of smoke too great to be forced through a filter, i.e., from bituminous coal.

Ringelmann scale. A measure of smoke color. Invented by Professor Maximilian Ringelmann in Paris in 1888, it is essentially a card with squares of black, white and shades of gray which is held up and the comparative grayness of the smoke judged. Highly dependent on light conditions and the skill of the observer it allocates a grayness number from 0 (white) to 5 (black) which has only a passing relationship to the actual quantity of smoke. Nonetheless, the simplicity of the Ringelmann scale means that it has been adopted as a standard in many countries.

Optical scattering. A light beam is passed through the smoke. A light detector is situated at an angle to the light source, typically at 90°, so that it receives only light reflected from passing particles. A measurement is made of the light received which will be higher as the concentration of smoke particles becomes higher.

Optical obscuration. A light beam is passed through the smoke and a detector opposite measures the light. The more smoke particles are present between the two, the less light will be measured.

Combined optical methods. There are various proprietary optical smoke measurement devices such as the 'nephelometer' or the 'aethalometer' which use several different optical methods, including more than one wavelength of light, inside a single instrument and apply an algorithm to give a good estimate of smoke. It has been claimed that these devices can differentiate types of smoke and so their probable source can be inferred, though this is disputed.

Inference from carbon monoxide. Smoke is incompletely burned fuel, carbon monoxide is incompletely burned carbon, therefore it has long been assumed that measurement of CO in flue gas (a cheap, simple and very accurate procedure) will provide a good indication of the levels of smoke. Indeed, several jurisdictions use CO measurement as the basis of smoke control. However it is far from clear how accurate the correspondence is.

== Traditional medicinal smoking ==
Historically, people have used the smoke of medicinal plants in attempts to treat illness. A sculpture from Persepolis shows Darius the Great (522–486 BC), the king of Persia, with two censers in front of him for burning Peganum harmala, Santalum album, or both. This was believed to protect the king from evil and disease. By the late 20th century, more than 300 plant species across 5 continents were used in smoke form for various diseases. As a method of drug administration, smoking is a simple, inexpensive, but very effective method of extracting particles containing active agents. More importantly, generating smoke reduces the particle size to a microscopic scale thereby increasing the absorption of its active chemical principles. However, as of the early 21st century, this traditional use has been little studied by modern medicine.

== See also ==
- Air purifier
- Bonfire
- Great Smog of London
- Health impacts of sawdust
- Inversion (meteorology)
- Joss paper
- Open burning of waste
- Smog
- Smoke abatement
- Ultrafine particle

== Sources ==
- "Smoke" . Encyclopædia Britannica. Vol. 25 (11th ed.). 1911.
