= Salted bomb =

Type of nuclear weapon

A salted bomb is a nuclear weapon designed to function as a radiological weapon by producing larger quantities of radioactive fallout than unsalted nuclear arms. This fallout can render a large area uninhabitable. The term is derived both from the means of their manufacture, which involves the incorporation of additional elements (e.g., sodium-23) to a standard atomic weapon, and from the expression "to salt the earth", meaning to render an area uninhabitable for generations. The idea originated with Hungarian-American physicist Leo Szilard, in February 1950. His intent was not to propose that such a weapon be built, but to show that nuclear weapon technology would soon reach the point where it could end human life on Earth.

No intentionally salted bomb has ever been atmospherically tested, and as far as is publicly known, none has ever been built. However, the UK tested a one-kiloton bomb incorporating a small amount of cobalt as an experimental radiochemical tracer at their Tadje testing site in Maralinga range, Australia, on September 14, 1957. The Soviet triple "taiga" nuclear salvo test, as part of the preliminary March 1971 Pechora–Kama Canal project, converted significant amounts of stable cobalt-59 to radioactive cobalt-60 by fusion-generated neutron activation and this product is responsible for about half of the gamma dose measured at the test site in 2011. The experiment was regarded as a failure and was not repeated.

A salted bomb should not be confused with a "dirty bomb", which is an ordinary explosive bomb containing radioactive material which is spread over the area when the bomb explodes. A salted bomb is capable of megatons of explosive force, which can contaminate a far larger area with far more radioactive material than even the largest practicable dirty bomb.

== Design ==
Salted versions of both fission and fusion weapons can be made by surrounding the core of the explosive device with a material containing an element that can be converted to a highly radioactive isotope by neutron bombardment. When the bomb explodes, the element absorbs neutrons released by the nuclear reaction, converting it to its radioactive form. The explosion scatters the resulting radioactive material over a wide area, leaving it uninhabitable far longer than an area affected by typical nuclear weapons. In a salted hydrogen bomb, the radiation case around the fusion fuel, which normally is made of some fissionable element, is replaced with a metallic salting element. Salted fission bombs can be made by replacing the neutron reflector between the fissionable core and the explosive layer with a metallic element. The energy yield from a salted weapon is usually lower than from an ordinary weapon of similar size as a consequence of these changes.

The radioactive isotope used for the fallout material would be a high-intensity gamma ray emitter, with a half-life long enough that it remains lethal for an extended period. It would also have to have a chemistry that causes it to return to earth as fallout, rather than stay in the atmosphere after being vaporized in the explosion. Another consideration is biological: radioactive isotopes of elements normally taken up by plants and animals as nutrition would pose a special threat to organisms that absorbed them, as their radiation would be delivered from within the body of the organism.

Radioactive isotopes that have been suggested for salted bombs include gold-198, tantalum-182, zinc-65, and cobalt-60. Sodium-23, the only stable isotope, has also been proposed as a casing for a salted bomb. Neutron flux would activate it to ^{24}Na, which would produce intense gamma-ray emissions for several days after the detonation. Physicist W. H. Clark looked at the potential of such devices and estimated that a 20 megaton bomb salted with sodium would generate sufficient radiation to contaminate 200,000 square miles (520,000 km^{2}) (an area that is slightly larger than Spain or Thailand, though smaller than France). Given the intensity of the gamma radiation, not even those in basement shelters could survive within the fallout zone. However, the short half-life of sodium-24 (15 h) would mean that the radiation would not spread far enough to be a true doomsday weapon.

A cobalt bomb was first suggested by Leo Szilard in 1950. He publicly sounded the alarm against the possible development of salted thermonuclear bombs capable of annihilating mankind on a University of Chicago Round Table radio program. His comments, as well as those of Hans Bethe, Harrison Brown, and Frederick Seitz (the three other scientists who participated in the program), were attacked by the Atomic Energy Commission's former Chairman David Lilienthal, and the criticisms plus a response from Szilard were published. Time compared Szilard to Chicken Little while the AEC dismissed his ideas, but scientists debated whether it was feasible or not. The Bulletin of the Atomic Scientists commissioned a study by James R. Arnold, who concluded that it was. In his 1961 essay, Clark suggested that a 50 megaton cobalt bomb did have the potential to produce sufficient long-lasting radiation to be a doomsday weapon, in theory, but was of the view that, even then, "enough people might find refuge to wait out the radioactivity and emerge to begin again."

== In popular culture ==
- In Nevil Shute's novel On the Beach (1957), cobalt bombs are mentioned as the cause of the lethal radioactivity that is approaching Australia. The cobalt bomb was a symbol of man's hubris.
- The post-apocalyptic novel A Canticle for Leibowitz by Walter M. Miller Jr. begins hundreds of years after a civilization-ending nuclear holocaust, which is implied to have used salted and dirty bombs. In the 26th century, monks pray a litany that includes the lines: "From the rain of the cobalt, O Lord, deliver us. From the rain of the strontium, O Lord, deliver us. From the fall of the cesium, O Lord, deliver us. From the curse of the Fallout, O Lord, deliver us."
- In City of Fear (1959), an escaped convict from San Quentin State Prison steals a canister of cobalt-60, thinking it contains drugs. He flees to Los Angeles to pawn it, not knowing it could kill him and possibly contaminate the city.
- In Dr. Strangelove, or: How I Learned to Stop Worrying and Love the Bomb (1964), a type of cobalt-salted bomb is employed, specifically utilizing a composite called 'Cobalt-Thorium G' with a Dead Hand mechanism, by the Soviet Union as a 'doomsday device' nuclear deterrent: if the system detects any nuclear attack, the doomsday device will be automatically unleashed. In the film, the Soviet Ambassador says, "If you take, say, fifty H-bombs in the hundred megaton range and jacket them with Cobalt-Thorium G, when they are exploded they will produce a doomsday shroud. A lethal cloud of radioactivity which will encircle the earth for ninety-three years!"
- In the James Bond film Goldfinger (1964), the title character informs Bond he intends to set off a "particularly dirty" atomic device using "cobalt and iodine" in the U.S. Bullion Depository at Fort Knox as part of Operation Grand Slam, a scheme intended to contaminate the gold at Fort Knox to increase value of the gold he has been stockpiling.
- In Roger Zelazny's 1965 Hugo Award–winning novel This Immortal, Earth has suffered a nuclear war many decades ago and some areas still suffer high radiation levels from cobalt bombs, leading to drastic mutations and ecological changes.
- In the fourth act of the classic Star Trek episode "Obsession" (1967), Ensign Garrovick refers to 10,000 cobalt bombs not equaling the power of less than one ounce of antimatter.
- The protagonist in Anna Kavan's science fiction work Ice (1967) speculates about the existence of a "self-detonating cobalt bomb" that will hasten the destruction of civilisation.
- In Beneath the Planet of the Apes (1970) the main character, upon seeing that an underground mutant community worship a doomsday bomb, comments "They finally built one with a cobalt casing" in reference to a cobalt bomb that could wipe out the world. After astronauts Brent and Taylor are shot by an invading army of apes, Taylor's dying act is to detonate the doomsday bomb, obliterating all life on fortieth century Earth.
- In Tom Clancy's novel The Sum of All Fears (1991) it is noted that Israeli Air Force tactical nuclear bombs can optionally be fitted with cobalt jackets "to poison a landscape to all kinds of life for years to come".
- In the video game Metro Exodus (2019), the player visits the Russian city of Novosibirsk which was hit with at least one cobalt warhead during a worldwide nuclear war in the year 2013, resulting in catastrophic levels of radiation, and is the most irradiated area visited in the three Metro games.
- In the video game Detroit: Become Human (2018), the player has the option of detonating an improvised cobalt bomb during certain endings of the game. The detonation of the bomb results in humans evacuating the now-irradiated city of Detroit and the area 50 miles (80 km) around, though promising to retake it from the androids in the future. Depending on the player's actions, the city is left empty or the androids claim it for their own.
- In a two-part episode of the TV show The Bionic Woman, "Doomsday Is Tomorrow", a cobalt bomb, dubbed by its creator as "the most diabolical instrument of destruction ever conceived by man," is used as a trigger for a more powerful weapon that can render the world lifeless.
- The Fallout video game series is set in a post-nuclear holocaust United States. The nuclear weapons in the series bear more resemblance to salted bombs than standard nuclear weapons, sacrificing explosive yield for radiological yield.
- In the third season of The Diplomat TV series, a Russian submarine carrying the "Poseidon" torpedo is described as a "salted bomb designed to maximize radioactive fallout."

== See also ==
- Doomsday device
- Fail-deadly
