= Arthur V. Peterson =

United States Army officer

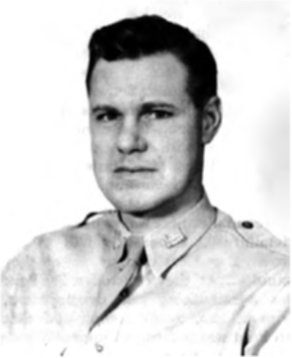
- Born: October 31, 1912; Morristown, New Jersey, U.S.
- Died: March 24, 2008 (aged 95); Seattle, Washington, U.S.
- Burial place: Tahoma National Cemetery, King County, Washington, U.S.
- Military career
- Allegiance: United States of America
- Branch: United States Army
- Service years: 1941–1946
- Rank: Colonel
- Conflicts: World War II

Arthur Vincent (Pete) Peterson (October 31, 1912 – March 24, 2008) was a United States Army colonel who served as the Manhattan District's Chicago Area Engineer. In this capacity he was responsible for the Metallurgical Laboratory, which developed the first nuclear reactors. Plutonium bred in these reactors was used in the Fat Man atomic bomb that was dropped on Nagasaki. He traveled to Europe before D-Day to warn General Dwight D. Eisenhower about the dangers of the Germans using radioactive weapons.

After the war he was the chief of its Fissionable Materials Branch of the Atomic Energy Commission (AEC) from 1947 to 1953, when he left to become general manager of the new Atomic Energy Division of American Machine and Foundry, Over the following five years, he supervised the construction of 20 research reactors around the world. He left in 1958 to found his own consulting firm, AVP Associates.

== Early life and education ==
Arthur Vincent (Pete) Peterson was born in Morristown, New Jersey, on October 31, 1912, and grew up on Manhattan's East Side, where he attended Stuyvesant High School, from which he graduated in 1930. He entered New York University, from which he earned a bachelor's degree in civil engineering in 1934, and then Cornell University, from which he received a master's degree in civil engineering in 1937. He went to work as an engineer in New Jersey, but returned to Cornell in 1940, where he performed research for the Firestone Tire and Rubber Company.

== Military career ==
A reserve officer in the United States Army, Peterson was called up to active duty in July 1941, and was joined the 36th Combat Engineer Regiment at Plattsburgh Barracks, New York, where he married Marie-Louise Darrieulat, his college sweetheart, whose father taught at Cornell. The 36th Combat Engineer Regiment subsequently moved to Fort Bragg, North Carolina.

In August 1942, Peterson was assigned to the Manhattan District; arranged by Kenneth Nichols, who was impressed by his knowledge of physics and electronics. However they both accepted that as Peterson's wife Marie-Louise was the sister of Nichol's wife Jacky, and that this worked to his disadvantage as he could not be reported on by Nichols.

Peterson became the Chicago Area Engineer in December 1942, with the rank of major. As such, he was responsible for the activities of the Metallurgical Laboratory, which developed nuclear reactors in order to produce plutonium for atomic bombs. He briefed officers from the European Theater of Operations United States Army (ETOUSA) on possible forms an attack with radioactive poisons might take, and what the effects and symptoms of them were, and gave them instruments and shown how to use them. They were enjoined to tell other officers in the theater to report unexplained fogging of film or illnesses with symptoms corresponding to the effects of radiation sickness. i Nichols moved Peterson from responsibility for the Plutonium plant (Hanford Engineer Works) to a production control committee to optimize production at both plants. Peterson realised in 1945 after trying many potential combinations that at Clinton Engineer Works the production from S-50 should be fed to K25 rather than Y-12 and that adding more alpha stages to Y-12 as proposed by Ernest Lawrence was not the best answer for more production.

Peterson was sent to the Supreme Headquarters Allied Expeditionary Force (SHAEF), where he briefed the Supreme Allied Commander, General Dwight D. Eisenhower, Eisenhower's Chief of Staff, Lieutenant General Walter Bedell Smith, Assistant Chief of Staff (G-2) (Intelligence), Major General John Whiteley, and his Assistant Chief of Staff (G-3) (Operations), Major General Harold R. Bull in April 1944. As a result, they formulated a contingency plan, known as Operation Peppermint, in case the Germans used radioactive weapons.

In October 1944, Peterson was given overall responsibility for the production of fissile material, with the rank of lieutenant colonel. Plutonium bred in the Manhattan Project's reactors was used in the Fat Man atomic bomb that was dropped on Nagasaki. When the Manhattan Project was superseded by the Atomic Energy Commission (AEC) on January 1, 1947. Peterson became the chief of its Fissionable Materials Branch, a part of the Production Division, which was located in Washington, D.C.

== Later life ==
Peterson left the AEC in 1953 to become general manager of the new Atomic Energy Division of American Machine and Foundry, which was based in New York City. Over the following five years, he supervised the construction of 20 research reactors around the world. He left in 1958 to found his own consulting firm, AVP Associates.

== Death ==
Peterson died of natural causes at a retirement home in Seattle on March 24, 2008. He was survived by his sons Art and John. His wife died in 2004, and his daughter Medley in 2006. He was buried at Tahoma National Cemetery.
