= Operation Groundhog =

Operation Groundhog was a reported joint US-Kazakh-Russian program to secure radioactive residues of Soviet-era nuclear bomb tests, primarily with the intent of preventing their usage in other weapons of destruction, particularly terrorist access to fissile material.

In 2003, a report appeared in Science Magazine explained that over the previous four decades, as a result of more than 450 nuclear detonations in the northeastern region of Kazakhstan, particularly around the Semipalatinsk test site, area the area was contaminated with a significant amount of radioactive material that could potentially be utilised to create a dirty bomb.

The initial plan for the area was to convert it back to pasture and arable farmland. Radiation levels in the region were measured to this end. In some dispersed hotspots, however, radioactive levels were too high for human safety. Areas like these were paved with a thick layer (over six feet) of steel-reinforced concrete.

== See also ==
- Cactus Dome
