= Doomsday device =

Construct which could destroy all life on a planet or a planet itself

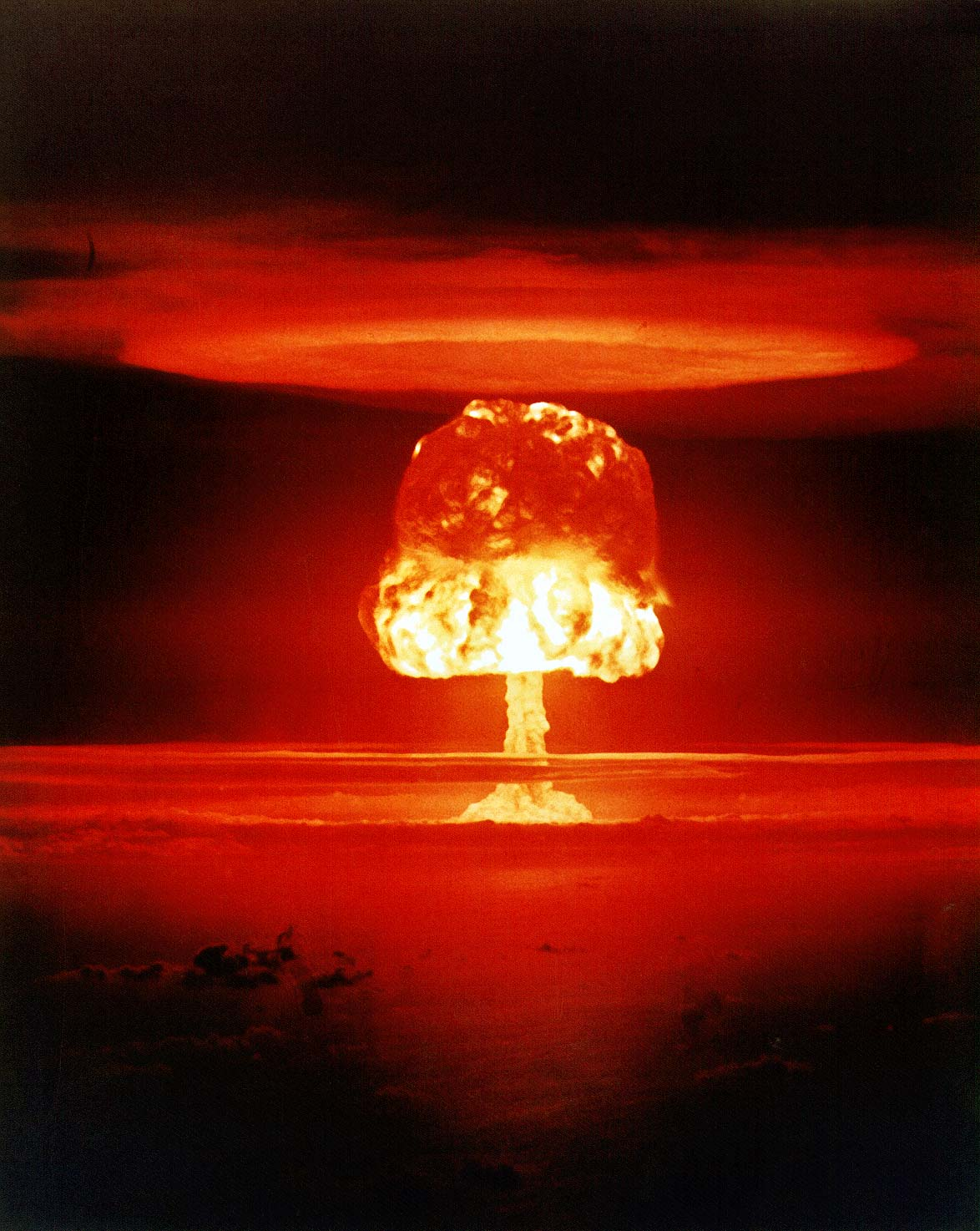
Many hypothetical doomsday devices are based on salted hydrogen bombs creating large amounts of nuclear fallout. Above, the Castle Romeo nuclear test (yield 11 megatons) at Bikini Atoll of the Marshall Islands, conducted on a barge moored in the middle of the crater created from the Castle Bravo test and the first nuclear test conducted on a vessel (March 26, 1954).

A doomsday device is a hypothetical construction – usually a weapon or weapons system – which could destroy all life on a planet, particularly Earth, or destroy the planet itself, bringing "doomsday", a term used for the end of planet Earth. Most hypothetical constructions rely on hydrogen bombs being made arbitrarily large, assuming there are no concerns about delivering them to a target (see Teller–Ulam design) or that they can be "salted" with materials designed to create long-lasting and hazardous fallout (e.g., a cobalt bomb).

Doomsday devices and the nuclear holocaust they bring about have been present in literature and art especially in the 20th century, when advances in science and technology made world destruction (or at least the eradication of all human life) a credible scenario. Many classics in the genre of science fiction take up the theme in this respect. The term "doomsday machine" itself is attested from 1960, but the alliterative "doomsday device" has since become the more popular phrase.

== History ==
Since the 1954 Castle Bravo thermonuclear weapon test demonstrated the feasibility of making arbitrarily large nuclear devices which could cover vast areas with radioactive fallout by rendering anything around them intensely radioactive, nuclear weapons theorists such as Leo Szilard conceived of a doomsday machine, a massive thermonuclear device surrounded by hundreds of tons of cobalt which, when detonated, would create massive amounts of cobalt-60, rendering most of the Earth too radioactive to support life. RAND strategist Herman Kahn postulated that Soviet or US nuclear decision makers might choose to build a doomsday machine that would consist of a computer linked to a stockpile of hydrogen bombs, programmed to detonate them all and bathe the planet in nuclear fallout at the signal of an impending nuclear attack from another nation.

The doomsday device's theoretical ability to deter a nuclear attack is that it would go off automatically without human aid and despite human intervention. Kahn conceded that some planners might see "doomsday machines" as providing a highly credible threat that would dissuade attackers and avoid the dangerous game of brinkmanship caused by the massive retaliation concept which governed US-Soviet nuclear relations in the mid-1950s. However, in his discussion of doomsday machines, Kahn raises the problem of a nuclear-armed Nth country triggering a doomsday machine, and states that he didn't advocate that the US acquire a doomsday machine.

The Dead Hand (or "Perimeter") system built by the Soviet Union during the Cold War has been called a "doomsday machine" due to its fail-deadly design and nuclear capabilities.

The Ohio-class nuclear-powered ballistic submarines have been referred to as doomsday weapons. They are designed to serve as the ultimate deterrent in the U.S. nuclear triad. The term describes the ship's ability to "deliver catastrophic nuclear strikes from a hidden, near-invulnerable position."

== In fiction ==
Doomsday devices started to become more common in science fiction in the 1940s and 1950s, after the invention of nuclear weapons and the constant fear of total destruction.

In 1957, the apocalyptic novel On The Beach was written by the notable British-Australian writer and aeronautical engineer Nevil Shute. The story talks about the disastrous event of a massive nuclear World War III using cobalt bombs that slowly poison the atmosphere of the entire earth, and how the remaining inhabitants in Australia wait for their end. Adapted into a film with the same name it was praised for its "antibomb" story. The New York Times called this book “The most haunting evocation we have of a world dying of radiation after an atomic war.”

In the film Dr. Strangelove (1964), a doomsday device, based on Szilard and Kahn's ideas, is triggered by an incompletely aborted American attack and all life on Earth is extinguished.

In the George Pal movie The Time Machine (1960), an 'atomic satellite' is responsible for the destruction of London in August 1966, causing geological disturbances triggering volcanic activity, the time traveler escapes before he is engulfed by the lava flows initiated by the satellite's explosions. Later in the films' plot it was revealed that the cataclysmic atomic warfare in 1966 was responsible for causing the division of humanity resulting in the Eloi and Morlocks.

In the Star Trek episode The Doomsday Machine (1967), the crew of the Enterprise fights a powerful planet-killing alien machine.

In Beneath the Planet of the Apes (1970), a cobalt bomb destroys life on earth.

Doomsday devices also expanded to encompass many other types of fictional technology, one of the most famous of which is the Death Star in Star Wars, a planet-destroying, moon-sized space station.

Some works have also considered the erroneous activation of doomsday devices by external factors, chain reactions, or cascading failures. An example of both is Virus (1980), where an earthquake is misdetected as a nuclear explosion and triggers a sequence of Automated Reaction Systems (ARS).

Various types of fictional doomsday devices have also been activated as part of an AI takeover. This includes the missile launch system in the movie WarGames (1983), control of which has been handed entirely to a computer, and Skynet's nigh-destruction of the human race in The Terminator (1984).

== See also ==
- 1983 Soviet nuclear false alarm incident
- Conflict escalation
- Doomsday Clock
- Fail-deadly
- Global catastrophic risk
- Mutual assured destruction
- Nuclear terrorism
- Poseidon (unmanned underwater vehicle)
- Salted bomb
- Sundial (weapon)
- Weapon of mass destruction
