= ASTM smoke pump =

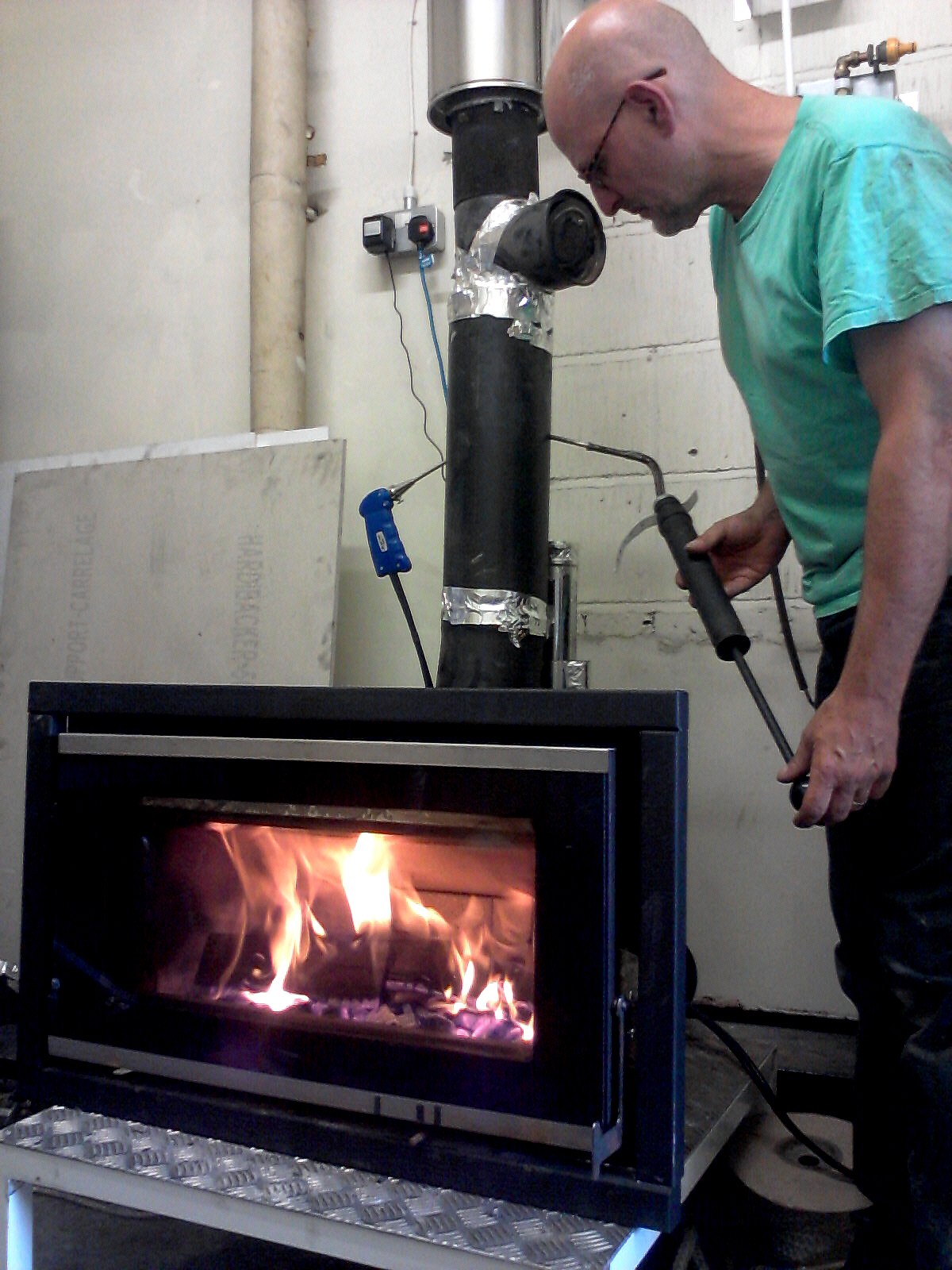
Technician using ASTM Smoke Spot Pump to evaluate emissions from an experimental wood stove

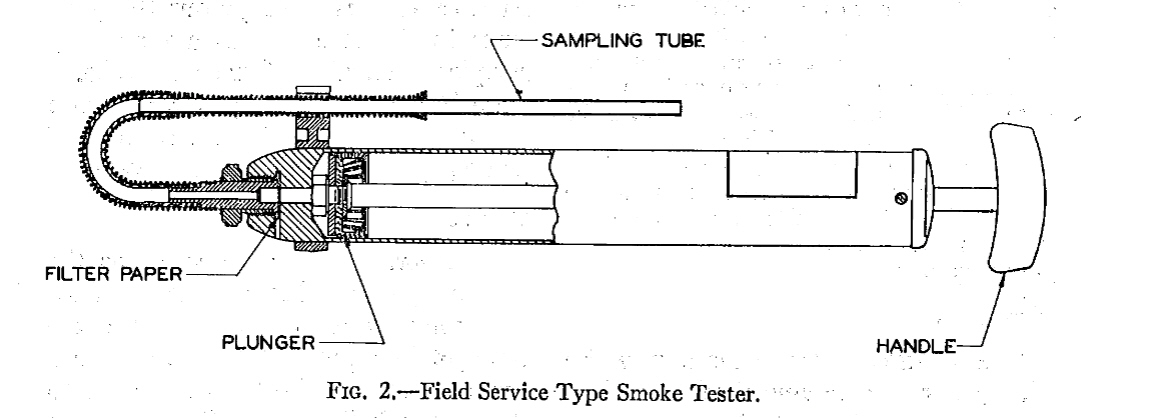
Diagram of ASTM Smoke Spot Pump, from the original specification document.

An ASTM Smoke Pump, or 'spot pump', is an instrument for evaluating the dark particle concentration of a smoke. It is very widely used (2014) by heating engineers to assess emissions, most commonly from fuel-burning appliances such as a wood stoves or oil boilers. It consists of a cylinder of precise size down which a close-fitting piston is pulled, sucking a sample of the smoke through a small nozzle against a filter paper (equivalent to Whatman No2 paper) so that a 'spot' is formed on the paper, the darkness of which can be compared with a standard chart to indicate the concentration of smoke.

Measurements made using the ASTM Smoke Pump form part of statutory requirements in the USA and Germany. Unlike other smoke measurement methods, the ASTM Pump provides a permanent record and sample of the smoke. Because its use takes only a few seconds, it can provide a series of smoke samples over time, allowing boilers etc. to be evaluated over a complete burning cycle and graphic data to be collected.

Because the system depends on comparison rather than an evaluation of the spot colour density, and because many successive samples can be taken, it is considered highly reliable. The ASTM Standard reports that, "The difference between test results obtained by the same operator with the same apparatus under constant operating conditions on identical test material would, in the long run, in the normal and correct operation of the test method, exceed one-half of a smoke spot number for only one case in twenty."

== Standard ==
The device is defined by the American Society for Testing and Materials (ASTM) in their Standard D2156 "Standard Test Method for Smoke Density in Flue Gases", first published in 1965, revised several times, most recently in 2018.

== Calibration ==
The instrument provides the technician with a dark spot on a filter paper strip which is then compared with a standard darkness chart, commonly numbered 0 to 10, 0 being entirely white and 10 being entirely black. The darkness can be related to the likely concentration of dark smoke particles in the flue gas by an empirical non-linear formula based on the OECD Document 'Methods of Measuring Air Pollution'.

$Sd = (154 \times(Ob^{2.8}))+3.6$

Where:
Sd = Actual smoke density on paper, in microgrammes (mcg) per square cm.
Ob = The observed paper obscuration, as a proportion (i.e. 0=white, 0.5=50% black, 1.0=black
