= Operation Peppermint =

1944 US preparations to counter possible threats from Germany

- Part of World War II
- Planned by: European Theater of Operations United States Army (ETOUSA)
- Objective: To counter the danger that the Germans might disrupt the Normandy landings with radioactive poisons
- Date: April 1944
- Outcome: Not required

Operation Peppermint was the codename given during World War II to preparations by the Manhattan Project and the European Theater of Operations United States Army (ETOUSA) to counter the danger that the Germans might disrupt the June 1944 Normandy landings with radioactive poisons.

In response, the Metallurgical Laboratory in Chicago and the Victoreen Instrument Company in Cleveland developed portable radiation detection devices suitable for use in the field. In 1944, Major General Leslie R. Groves, Jr., director of the Manhattan Project, sent Major Arthur V. Peterson to brief General Dwight D. Eisenhower and his senior staff officers at the Supreme Headquarters Allied Expeditionary Force (SHAEF).

In response, ETOUSA initiated Operation Peppermint. Special equipment was prepared. Eleven survey meters and a Geiger counter were shipped to England in early 1944, along with 1,500 film packets, which were used to measure radiation exposure. Another 25 survey meters, 5 Geiger counters and 1,500 film packets were held in storage in the United States, but in readiness to be shipped by air with the highest priority. Chemical Warfare Service teams were trained in its use, and Signal Corps personnel in its maintenance. The equipment was held in readiness, but the preparations were not needed, because the Germans had not developed such weapons.

== Background ==
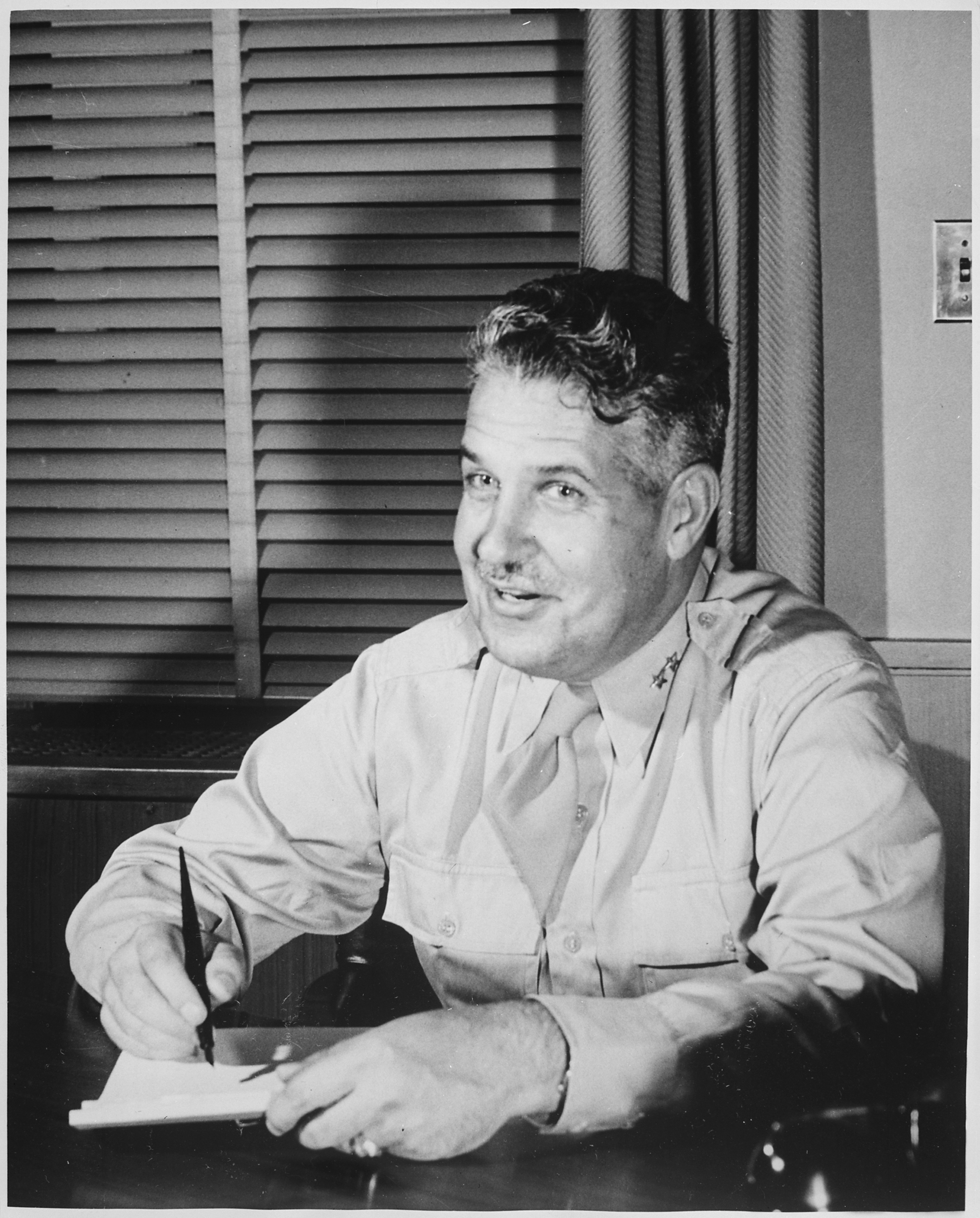
Major General Leslie R. Groves, Jr., director of the Manhattan Project

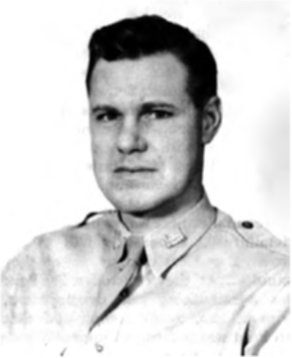
Major Arthur V. Peterson, Chicago area engineer, Manhattan District

When the Manhattan Project assumed responsibility for the development of nuclear weapons in September 1942, it also assumed responsibility for the development of suitable countermeasures. At the time, the threat posed by the German nuclear energy project was taken very seriously. Consideration was given to issuing a public warning of the danger of a German nuclear attack on the United States, but the director of the Manhattan Project, Brigadier General Leslie R. Groves, Jr., considered the likelihood of this to be sufficiently remote that he rejected the notion of taking so drastic a step.

A subcommittee of the S-1 Executive Committee, chaired by James B. Conant, and consisting of himself, Arthur Compton and Harold Urey, was appointed to look into the issue, and it similarly assessed the danger as low, but still sufficient to warrant taking some precautions. A program was initiated by the Metallurgical Laboratory in Chicago and the Victoreen Instrument Company in Cleveland to develop radiation detection devices suitable for use in the field. Some 48 portable detection meters were built in 1943, half of which were capable of detecting 0 to 10 roentgens per day, while the other half could detect from 0 to 100 roentgens per day. Instruments sets were stored at Manhattan District offices in Boston, Chicago, New York City, San Francisco and Washington, D.C., and the area engineer and some other officers were instructed in their use. A special team of scientists was created at the Metallurgical Laboratory who could respond to any reports of the use of nuclear weapons or radioactive poisons.

It was considered more likely that Germany might employ such weapons against the United Kingdom, so four officers from the European Theater of Operations United States Army (ETOUSA) including the G-3 Brigadier General George S. Eyster were summoned to Chicago, where they were given a top secret briefing by the Manhattan District's Chicago area engineer, Major Arthur V. Peterson. They were told about possible forms such an attack might take, and what the effects and symptoms of them were, and they were given survey instruments and shown how to use them. They were enjoined to tell other officers in the theater to report unexplained fogging of film or illnesses with symptoms corresponding to the effects of radiation sickness.

== Preparations ==
As the date for the Normandy landings (codenamed Operation Overlord) drew near in early 1944, Groves considered that risk was sufficient to send an officer to brief the Supreme Commander General Dwight D. Eisenhower of the possible use of radioactive poisons, particularly plutonium and fission products that might be created in their nuclear reactors. On 8 April 1944, Peterson reported to the Supreme Headquarters Allied Expeditionary Force (SHAEF) and met with Eisenhower, his chief of staff, Lieutenant General Walter Bedell Smith, assistant chief of staff (G-2) (Intelligence), Major General John Whiteley, and his assistant chief of staff (G-3) (Operations), Major General Harold R. Bull.

They considered creating an Allied plan to counter the danger, but Whiteley said that he would have to consult with the British command before this could be approved. Colonel G. S. Eyster from G-3 was then ordered to prepare an American plan, under the codename Operation Peppermint. Further briefings were given to Admiral Harold Stark, and Lieutenant Generals Carl Spaatz and John C. H. Lee, and Eisenhower also wrote to Lieutenant General Hastings Ismay, the chief of staff of the prime minister of the United Kingdom, Winston Churchill to inform the British Chiefs of Staff, but no British or American commanders actually participating in Operation Overlord were informed. The British subsequently adopted a similar plan to Operation Peppermint, and SHAEF assumed responsibility for coordinating the British and American efforts. Scientific assistance was provided by the Cavendish Laboratory.

Operation Peppermint provided for:

1. Centralization of all detection equipment and knowledge of its operation under ETOUSA;
2. Establishment of a means of detecting the use of radioactive substances; and
3. Channels for the reporting of such incidents to G-3 ETOUSA for immediate action.

Under Operation Peppermint, orders went out for medical personnel to report the details of any fogging or blackening of photographic or X-ray film, and medical officers were ordered to report diseases of unknown etiology involving fatigue, nausea, leukopenia or erythema. Eleven survey meters and a Geiger counter were shipped to England in early 1944, along with 1,500 film packets, which were used to measure radiation exposure. Another 25 survey meters, 5 Geiger counters and 1,500 film packets were held in storage in the United States, but in readiness to be shipped by air with the highest priority. Peterson instructed Chemical Warfare Service personnel in the use of the equipment, and Signal Corps personnel in its maintenance.

In the weeks leading up to D-Day, full-scale rehearsals of Operation Peppermint were carried out in order to test the plan and the equipment. Ground and aerial surveys were also carried out to detect the presence of radioactive substances in troop concentration areas, and at sites in the United Kingdom that had been bombed, but none were detected.

== Outcome ==
The Germans had not developed, and did not employ radioactive poisons, so Operation Peppermint was never put into effect. After VE-Day, the equipment and all the documents relating to Operation Peppermint were collected, returned to the United States, and handed over to the Manhattan Project. However, the effort put into developing portable radiation detection equipment was not wasted. Survey teams from the Manhattan Project used the equipment to assess the fallout from the Trinity nuclear test, the bombing of Hiroshima and Nagasaki, and Operation Crossroads, during which 10,000 film badges were used.
