= Hot particle =

Nuclear risk to human health

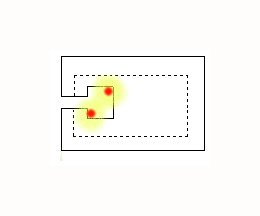
Hot particles irradiating from inside subject

A hot particle is a microscopic piece of radioactive material that can become lodged in living tissue and deliver a concentrated dose of radiation to a small area. A generally accepted theory proposes that hot particles within the body are vastly more dangerous than external emitters delivering the same dose of radiation in a diffused manner. Other researchers claim that there is little or no difference in risk between internal and external emitters, maintaining that individuals will likely continue to accumulate radiation dose from internal sources even after being removed from the original hazard and properly decontaminated, regardless of the relative danger from an internally sourced radiation dose compared to an equivalent externally sourced radiation dose.

The theory has gained most prominence in debates over the health effects of nuclear accidents, dirty bombs or fallout from nuclear weapons, all of which can spread hot particles through the environment. The current ICRP risk model for radiation exposure is derived from studies of victims of external radiation, and detractors claim it does not adequately estimate the risk of hot particles.

== Attributes ==
Hot particles contained in far-traveled nuclear fallout range in size from 10 nanometers to 20 micrometers, whereas those present in local fallout may be much larger (100 micrometers to several millimeters). Hot particles can be identified by a Geiger counter, or by autoradiography, i.e., fogging X-Ray film. Their age and origin can be determined by their isotopic signature.

Due to their small size, hot particles may be swallowed, inhaled or enter the body by other means. Once lodged in the body, cells very near the hot particle may absorb much of its radiation, and be bombarded in a very sustained and concentrated fashion. By contrast, an external radioactive source delivering the same total amount of radiation over the whole body would give a relatively minute dose to any one cell.

== Estimating health risk ==
The Committee Examining Radiation Risks of Internal Emitters (CERRIE), established by the UK Government, carried out a 3-year-long independent expert review into the health risks of internal emitters (i.e., hot particles) and published its findings in 2003. The study failed to reach consensus, but the conclusion of the majority of its members was that the current ICRP risk model, despite being largely derived from studies of survivors of external radiation, adequately estimates the risk of hot particles, and that any differences between internal and external radiation are adequately accommodated by the established parameters in physiological models (relative biological effectiveness, kinetic factors); i.e., that internal radiation does not seem to be significantly more dangerous than an equal amount of externally delivered radiation. However, they noted significant levels of uncertainty regarding dose estimates for internal emitters, especially regarding less common radionuclides such as ^{239}Pu and ^{241}Am, and even more common ones such as ^{90}Sr. Two of the twelve members disagreed with the overall findings, notably Christopher Busby who advocates controversial physico-biological mechanisms such as Second Event Theory and Photoelectric Effect Theory, by which he believes the danger of ingested particles could be greatly enhanced.

Another study largely corroborates the CERRIE findings, though emphasizing the paucity of useful data, substantial uncertainties over accuracy, and the existence of evidence for at least some modest "enhanced cell transformation for hot-particle exposures".

== Origin ==
Hot particles released into the environment may originate in nuclear reactors or nuclear explosions. The Chernobyl disaster was a major source of hot particles, as the core of the reactor was breached, but they have also been released into the environment through illegal dumping of low-level waste at Dounreay. They are also a component of the black rain or other nuclear fallout resulting from detonations of a nuclear weapon, including the more than 2000 nuclear weapons tests in the mid-20th century. Nonradioactive substances can be turned radioactive primarily through neutron activation, though other reactions are also possibilities; this induced radioactivity can be dispersed in hot particles.

Cold War nuclear tests included safety trials in which fissile material was not detonated, but was sometimes dispersed, including plutonium vapor, plutonium aerosols of various sizes, plutonium oxide particulates, plutonium-coated particles, and sizeable lumps of plutonium-contaminated structural material.

Accidents involving satellites and other devices are another source. The crash of the Kosmos 954 satellite released hot particles from its onboard BES-5 nuclear powerplant.

Accidents during transportation of nuclear weapons or nuclear waste are another potential source. A Boeing B-52 Stratofortress nuclear-armed bomber crashed in the area of the northwest Greenland town of Thule (since renamed to Qaanaaq), releasing hot particles.

Common failure of nuclear fuel may result in fuel fleas, which can be found in some facilities that process spent nuclear fuel.
