= HOPO 14-1 =

Investigational drug product for treatment of heavy metal poisoning

3,4,3-LI(1,2-HOPO)

Legal status
- Legal status: Investigational

Identifiers
- IUPAC name: N,N′-1,4-Butanediylbis[N-[3-[[(1,6-dihydro-1-hydroxy-6-oxo-2-pyridinyl)carbonyl]amino]propyl]-1,6-dihydro-1-hydroxy-6-oxo-2-pyridinecarboxamide]
- CAS Number: 110874-36-7
- PubChem CID: 132648
- ChemSpider: 117108
- UNII: R6SML525FN
- ChEMBL: ChEMBL264485
- CompTox Dashboard (EPA): DTXSID301358764

Chemical and physical data
- Formula: C_{34}H_{38}N_{8}O_{12}
- Molar mass: 750.722 g·mol^{−1}
- 3D model (JSmol): Interactive image
- SMILES: O=C1C=CC=C(C(=O)NCCCN(C(=O)C2=CC=CC(=O)N2O)CCCCN(C(=O)C3=CC=CC(=O)N3O)CCCNC(=O)C4=CC=CC(=O)N4O)N1O
- InChI: InChI=1S/C34H38N8O12/c43-27-13-3-9-23(39(27)51)31(47)35-17-7-21-37(33(49)25-11-5-15-29(45)41(25)53)19-1-2-20-38(34(50)26-12-6-16-30(46)42(26)54)22-8-18-36-32(48)24-10-4-14-28(44)40(24)52/h3-6,9-16,51-54H,1-2,7-8,17-22H2,(H,35,47)(H,36,48); Key:KUWKQASGHNTJAT-UHFFFAOYSA-N

HOPO 14-1 is an investigational drug product for removing radioactive contaminants from the body. It is an oral capsule designed to act as a defence against radioactive threats such as nuclear power plant accidents or dirty bomb attacks. The active ingredient is the hydroxypyridinone ligand 3,4,3-LI(1,2-HOPO), which is a powerful chelating agent. HOPO 14-1 works by selectively binding to heavy metals in the body and forming a complex that the body can naturally excrete. The drug is also being studied as a treatment for other forms of heavy metal toxicity, including lead poisoning and exposure to gadolinium from MRI contrast agents. HOPO 14-1 was developed at Lawrence Berkeley National Laboratory by actinide chemist Rebecca Abergel. Abergel and former postdoc Julian Avery Rees co-founded HOPO Therapeutics, a company commercializing HOPO 14-1 and other treatments for heavy metal poisoning.

== See also ==
- Diethylenetriamine pentaacetate
