= Fuel fleas =

Fuel fleas are microscopic hot particles of new or spent nuclear fuel. While small, they tend to be intensely radioactive. The fuel particles, the size about 10 micrometers, are a strong source of beta and gamma radiation and a weaker source of alpha radiation. The disparity between alpha and beta radiation (alpha activity is typically 100–1000 times weaker than beta, so the particle loses much more negatively charged particles than positively charged ones) leads to a buildup of positive electrostatic charge on the particle, causing the particle to "jump" from surface to surface and easily become airborne.

Fuel fleas are typically rich in uranium-238 and contain an abundance of insoluble fission products. Due to their high beta activity, they can be detected by a Geiger counter. Their gamma output can allow analysis of their isotope composition (and therefore their age and origin) by a gamma-ray spectrometer.

Fuel fleas can be very dangerous if they become embedded within a person's body, but are generally not considered more dangerous than an equal amount of radioactive material evenly distributed throughout the body. An exception would be if the flea was embedded in a particularly vulnerable organ such as the cornea of the eye or inhaled into the lungs.

The most likely cause of fuel fleas is when the cladding surrounding the nuclear fuel becomes ruptured or cracked (known as "fuel pin failure"), allowing the fuel particles to escape and allowing the coolant to enter the fuel rod, further accelerating the process. In water-cooled reactors, this can be due to the reaction of the zirconium alloy cladding with the cooling water, which produces hydrogen. The hydrogen can be absorbed into the cladding material, resulting in hydrogen embrittlement. Embrittled cladding is less ductile and more susceptible to cracking. This process is avoided in modern reactors by carefully monitoring the fuel assemblies, limiting operating lifetime of the fuel, and by using alloys developed to resist hydride formation.
