= Smoke control =

In the event of a fire, a smoke control system is used to keep a building's escape routes and access routes free from smoke, assist fire-fighting operations and delay or prevent flashover, thereby reducing the risk that the fire will escalate.

In the United Kingdom, the Smoke Control Association operates as a professional and advisory organisation in this field.

== Standards ==
Within the International Organization for Standardization (ISO), Technical Committee ISO/TC 21/SC 11 is responsible for the development of standards concerned with smoke and heat control systems and components.

In Australia and New Zealand, joint standard AS/NZS 1668.1:2015 aims to provide:

standardized minimum requirements for mechanical air-handling and mechanical smoke control systems for use by designers, installers, inspectors and regulators of these systems.

Requirements for the maintenance of smoke control systems fall outside this standard.
