= Cobalt bomb =

Hypothetical salted nuclear bomb

A cobalt bomb is a type of salted bomb: a nuclear weapon designed to produce enhanced amounts of radioactive fallout, intended to contaminate a large area with radioactive material, potentially for the purpose of radiological warfare, mutual assured destruction or as doomsday devices. There is no firm evidence that such a device has ever been built or tested.

== History ==
The concept of a cobalt bomb was originally described in a radio program by physicist Leó Szilárd on February 26, 1950. His intent was not to propose that such a weapon be built, but to show that nuclear weapon technology would soon reach the point where a doomsday device could end human life on Earth.

The Operation Antler/Round 1 test by the British at the Tadje site in the Maralinga range in Australia on September 14, 1957, tested a bomb using cobalt pellets as a radiochemical tracer for estimating nuclear weapon yield. This was considered a failure, and the experiment was not repeated. In Russia, the triple "taiga" nuclear salvo test, as part of the preliminary March 1971 Pechora–Kama Canal project, produced relatively high amounts of cobalt-60 (^{60}Co or Co-60) from the steel that surrounded the taiga devices, with this fusion-generated neutron activation product being responsible for about half of the gamma dose in 2011 at the test site. The high percentage contribution is largely because the devices primarily used fusion rather than fission reactions, so the quantity of gamma-emitting caesium-137 fallout was comparatively low. A secondary forest now exists around the lake that was formed by the detonation.

In 2015, a page from an apparent Russian nuclear torpedo design was leaked. The design was titled "Oceanic Multipurpose System Status-6", later given the official name Poseidon. The document states the torpedo would create "wide areas of radioactive contamination, rendering them unusable for military, economic or other activity for a long time." Its payload would be "many tens of megatons in yield". Russian government newspaper Rossiiskaya Gazeta speculated that the warhead would be a cobalt bomb. It is not known whether the Status-6 is a real project or whether it is Russian disinformation. In 2018, the Pentagon's annual Nuclear Posture Review stated Russia is developing a system called the "Status-6 Oceanic Multipurpose System". If Status-6 does exist, it is not publicly known whether the leaked 2015 design is accurate or whether the 2015 claim that the torpedo might be a cobalt bomb is genuine. Amongst other comments on it, Edward Moore Geist wrote a paper in which he says that "Russian decision makers would have little confidence that these areas would be in the intended locations" and Russian military experts are cited as saying that "robotic torpedoes could have other purposes, such as delivering deep-sea equipment or installing surveillance devices." The Poseidon nuclear weapon was later claimed by Russia's state television as real, described as being supposedly intended to destroy Britain and the Western Europe with a gigantic radioactive tsunami wave as stated by Dmitry Kiselyov's public threat of nuclear annihilation. Kiselyov's claim appeared to contain factual errors. Later, another Russian TV presenter, Vladimir Solovyov, issued a similar threat claiming that the Poseidon system could destroy the entire continental United States. Solovyov then issued another such threat against in America, claiming the existence of the "Poseidon-2".

== Mechanism ==
Decay of cobalt-60 showing the release of powerful gamma rays.

A cobalt bomb could be made by placing a quantity of ordinary cobalt metal (^{59}Co) around a thermonuclear weapon. When the bomb explodes, the neutrons produced by the fusion reaction in the secondary stage of the thermonuclear bomb's explosion would transmute the cobalt to the radioactive cobalt-60, which would be vaporized by the explosion. The cobalt would then condense and fall back to Earth with the dust and debris from the explosion, contaminating the ground. The deposited cobalt-60 would have a half-life of 5.27 years, decaying into ^{60}Ni and emitting two gamma rays with energies of 1.17 and 1.33 MeV, hence the overall nuclear equation of the reaction is:

^{59}_{27}Co + n → ^{60}_{27}Co → ^{60}_{28}Ni + e^{−} + gamma rays.

Nickel-60 is a stable isotope and undergoes no further decays after the transmutation is complete.

The 5.27 year half-life of the ^{60}Co is long enough to allow it to settle out before significant decay has occurred and to render it impractical to wait in shelters for it to decay, yet short enough that intense radiation is produced. Many isotopes are more radioactive (gold-198, tantalum-182, zinc-65, sodium-24, and many more), but they would decay faster, possibly allowing some population to survive in shelters.

== Nuclear fallout ==
Fission products are more deadly than neutron-activated cobalt in the first few weeks following detonation. After one to six months, the fission products from even a large-yield thermonuclear weapon decay to levels tolerable by humans. The large-yield thermonuclear weapon is thus automatically a weapon of radiological warfare, but its fallout decays much more rapidly than that of a cobalt bomb. A cobalt bomb's fallout on the other hand would render affected areas effectively stuck in this interim state for decades: habitable but not safe for constant habitation.

Initially, gamma radiation from the fission products of an equivalent size thermonuclear weapon are much more intense than Co-60: 15,000 times more intense at 1 hour; 35 times more intense at 1 week; 5 times more intense at 1 month; and about equal at 6 months. Thereafter fission product fallout radiation levels drop off rapidly, so that Co-60 fallout is 8 times more intense than fission at 1 year and 150 times more intense at 5 years. The very long-lived isotopes produced by fission would overtake the ^{60}Co again after about 75 years.

Complete 100% conversion into Co-60 is unlikely; a 1957 British experiment at Maralinga showed that Co-59's neutron absorption ability was much lower than predicted, resulting in a very limited formation of Co-60 isotope in practice. In addition, fallout is not deposited evenly throughout the path downwind from a detonation, so some areas would be relatively unaffected by fallout, and the Earth would not be universally rendered lifeless by a cobalt bomb. The fallout and devastation following a nuclear detonation does not scale upwards linearly with the explosive yield. As a result, the concept of "overkill"—the idea that one can simply estimate the destruction and fallout created by a thermonuclear weapon of the size postulated by Leo Szilard's "cobalt bomb" thought experiment by extrapolating from the effects of thermonuclear weapons of smaller yields—is fallacious.

== Radiation levels and time ==
For the type of radiation given by a cobalt bomb, the dosage measured in sievert (Sv) and gray (Gy) can be treated as equivalent. This is because the relevant harmful radiation from cobalt-60 is gamma rays. When converting between sievert and gray for gamma rays, the radiation type weighting factor will be 1, and the radiation will be a highly penetrating radiation spread evenly over the body so the tissue type weighting factor will also be 1.

Assume a cobalt bomb deposits intense fallout causing a dose rate of 10 Sv per hour. At this dose rate, any unsheltered person exposed to the fallout would receive a lethal dose in about 30 minutes (assuming a median lethal dose of 5 Sv). People in well-built shelters would be safe due to radiation shielding.

- After one half-life of 5.27 years, the dose rate in the affected area would be 5 Sv/hour. At this dose rate, a person exposed to the radiation would receive a lethal dose in 1 hour.
- After 10 half-lives (about 53 years), the dose rate would have decayed to around 10 mSv/hour. At this point, a healthy person could spend up to 4 days exposed to the fallout with no immediate effects. Long-term effects from this exposure would be increased risk to develop cancer. At the 4th day, the accumulated dose will be about 1 Sv, at which point the first symptoms of acute radiation syndrome may appear.
- After 20 half-lives (about 105 years), the dose rate would have decayed to around 10 μSv/hour. At this stage, humans could remain unsheltered full-time since their yearly radiation dose would be about 80 mSv. This yearly dose rate is about 30 times greater than the average natural background radiation rate of 2.4 mSv/year, but within its variability. At this dose rate, causal connection to cancer incidence would be difficult to establish.
- After 25 half-lives (about 130 years), the dose rate from cobalt-60 would have decayed to less than 0.4 μSv/hour and could be considered negligible.

== Decontamination ==
It may be possible to decontaminate relatively small areas contaminated by a cobalt bomb with equipment such as excavators and bulldozers covered with lead glass, similar to those employed at the cleanup of the Semipalatinsk Test Site. By skimming off the thin layer of fallout on the topsoil and burying it in the likes of a deep trench along with isolating it from ground water sources, the gamma air dose is cut by orders of magnitude. The decontamination after the Goiânia accident in Brazil in 1987 and the possibility of a "dirty bomb" with Co-60, which has similarities with the environment that one would be faced with after a nuclear yielding cobalt bomb's fallout had settled, has prompted the invention of "sequestration coatings" and cheap liquid phase sorbents for Co-60 that would further aid in decontamination, including that of water.

== In popular culture ==
- In Nevil Shute's novel On the Beach (1957), cobalt bombs are given as the cause of the lethal radioactivity that is approaching Australia. The cobalt bomb was a symbol of man's hubris.
- In City of Fear (1959), an escaped convict from San Quentin State Prison steals a canister of cobalt-60, thinking it contains drugs. He flees to Los Angeles to pawn it, not knowing it could kill him and possibly contaminate the city.
- In the dark comedy Dr. Strangelove, or: How I Learned to Stop Worrying and Love the Bomb (1964), a type of cobalt-salted bomb is employed, specifically utilizing a composite called 'Cobalt-Thorium G' with a Dead Hand mechanism, by the Soviet Union as a 'doomsday device' nuclear deterrent: if the system detects any nuclear attack, the doomsday device will be automatically unleashed. With unfortunate timing, a deranged American general mutinies and orders an attack on the USSR before the Soviet secret device, already activated, could be unveiled to the world. One American bomber piloted by a hapless and unknowing crew gets through to their target; the Dead Hand mechanism works as designed and initiates a worldwide nuclear holocaust. In the film, the Soviet Ambassador says, "If you take, say, fifty H-bombs in the hundred megaton range and jacket them with Cobalt-Thorium G, when they are exploded they will produce a doomsday shroud. A lethal cloud of radioactivity which will encircle the earth for ninety-three years!"
- In the James Bond film Goldfinger (1964), the title character informs Bond he intends to set off a "particularly dirty" atomic device using "cobalt and iodine" in the U.S. Bullion Repository at Fort Knox as part of Operation Grand Slam, a scheme intended to contaminate the gold at Fort Knox to increase value of the gold he has been stockpiling.
- In Roger Zelazny's 1965 Hugo Award-winning novel This Immortal, Earth has suffered a nuclear war many decades ago and some areas still suffer high radiation levels from cobalt bombs, leading to drastic mutations and ecological changes.
- In the fourth act of the classic Star Trek episode "Obsession" (1967), Ensign Garrovick states that 10,000 cobalt bombs would be less powerful than one ounce of antimatter.
- In Beneath the Planet of the Apes (1970) the main character, upon seeing an underground mutant community worship a doomsday bomb, comments "They finally built one with a cobalt casing" in reference to a cobalt bomb that could wipe out the world. After astronauts Brent and Taylor are shot by an invading army of apes, Taylor's dying act is to detonate the doomsday bomb, obliterating all life on fortieth-century Earth.
- In a two-part episode of the TV show The Bionic Woman, "Doomsday Is Tomorrow", a cobalt bomb, dubbed by its creator as "the most diabolical instrument of destruction ever conceived by man" is used as a trigger for a more powerful weapon that can render the world lifeless.
- In Tom Clancy's novel The Sum of All Fears (1991) it is noted that Israeli Air Force tactical nuclear bombs can optionally be fitted with cobalt jackets "to poison a landscape to all kinds of life for years to come".
- In the Doctor Who New Adventures novel Timewyrm: Genesys (1991), the planet Anu was destroyed by a cobalt bomb in the year 2,700 BC. The cyborg responsible escapes in a spacecraft, which crashes in ancient Mesopotamia. After adopting the guise of the goddess Ishtar, she builds another cobalt bomb in the city of Kish to threaten the Seventh Doctor, Gilgamesh, and the city's king with the destruction of the Earth if they should interfere with her plans for world domination. This second bomb is later used as a nuclear power source for a spacecraft, allowing the surviving refugees of Anu to travel to a new homeworld.
- In the television show Designated Survivor (2016), over the course of Season Two, a plan to use a cobalt bomb on the city of Washington D.C. is discovered during diplomatic summits. The bomb and its maker are tracked by Special Agent Hannah Wells, but it ends up detonating and killing six federal agents, including FBI Director John Foerstel. It is later uncovered as planted by a conspiracy led by the ambassador of the fictional nation of Kunami in an attempted domestic power-play.
- In the video game Detroit: Become Human (2018), the player has the option of detonating an improvised cobalt bomb during certain endings of the game.
- In the video game Metro Exodus (2019), the player visits the Russian city of Novosibirsk which was hit with at least one cobalt warhead during a worldwide nuclear war in the year 2013, resulting in catastrophic levels of radiation, and easily the most irradiated area visited in the three Metro games. While the city is left largely standing even twenty years after the cobalt warhead's detonation, the radiation in the city is so lethal that even with lead-lined full enclosure suits, the player can only spend a few minutes on the surface before receiving lethal amounts of radiation poisoning. During their visit, the player discovers that the survivors of the attack survived underground for twenty-two years, but only due to constant injections of anti-radiation medicine.
- In Termination Shock by Neal Stephenson, a lead-lined briefcase is filled with activated cobalt wrapped around a conventional explosive bomb with the intention of detonating it under a weather alteration gun to render it unusable for a hundred years.

== See also ==
- Neutron bomb
