= Dirty bomb =

Type of radiological weapon

A dirty bomb or radiological dispersal device is a radiological weapon that combines radioactive material with conventional explosives. The purpose of the weapon is to contaminate the area around the dispersal agent/conventional explosion with radioactive material, serving primarily as an area denial device against civilians. It is not to be confused with a nuclear explosion, such as a fission bomb, which produces blast effects far in excess of what is achievable by the use of conventional explosives. Unlike the rain of radioactive material from a typical fission bomb, a dirty bomb's radiation can be dispersed only within a few hundred meters or a few miles of the explosion.

Dirty bombs have never been used, only tested. They are designed to disperse radioactive material over a certain area. They act through the effects of radioactive contamination on the environment and related health effects of radiation poisoning in the affected populations. The containment and decontamination of victims, as well as decontamination of the affected area require considerable time and expenses, rendering areas partly unusable and causing economic damage. Dirty bombs might be used to create mass panic as a weapon of terror.

== Effect of a dirty bomb explosion ==
When dealing with the implications of a dirty bomb attack, there are two main areas to be addressed: the civilian impact, not only dealing with immediate casualties and long term health issues, but also the psychological effect; and the economic impact. With no prior event of a dirty bomb detonation, it is considered difficult to predict the impact. Several analyses have predicted that radiological dispersal devices will neither sicken nor kill many people.

Differences between dirty bombs and fission bombs

Dirty bomb: Explosives combined with radioactive materials; Detonation vaporizes or aerosolizes radioactive material and propels it into the air; Not a nuclear detonation	Fission bomb: Caused by an uncontrolled nuclear chain reaction with highly enriched uranium or weapons-grade plutonium; Sphere of fissile material (pit) surrounded by explosive lenses; Initial explosion produces imploding shock wave that compresses pit inward, creating supercritical mass by increasing the density of fissile material. Neutrons from either modulated neutron initiator or external neutron generator start chain reaction in compressed pit; Resulting fission chain reaction causes bomb to explode with tremendous force: nuclear detonation

Source: Adapted from Levi MA, Kelly HC. "Weapons of mass disruption". Sci Am. 2002 Nov;287(5):76-81.

== Accidents with radioactives ==
The effects of uncontrolled radioactive contamination have been reported several times.

One example is the radiological accident occurring in Goiânia, Brazil, between September 1987 and March 1988: Two metal scavengers broke into an abandoned radiotherapy clinic and removed a teletherapy source capsule containing powdered caesium-137 with an activity of 50 TBq. They brought it back to the home of one of the men to take it apart and sell as scrap metal. Later that day both men were showing acute signs of radiation illness with vomiting and one of them had a swollen hand and diarrhea. A few days later one of the men punctured the 1-millimetre-thick (0.039 in) thick window of the capsule, allowing the caesium chloride powder to leak out and when realizing the powder glowed blue in the dark, brought it back home to his family and friends to show it off. After two weeks of its spreading by contact contamination, causing an increasing number of adverse health effects, the correct diagnosis of acute radiation sickness was made at a hospital, and proper precautions were initiated. By this time 249 people were contaminated, 151 exhibited both external and internal contamination, of whom 20 people were seriously ill, and five people died.

The Goiânia incident to some extent predicts the contamination pattern if it is not immediately realized that the explosion spread radioactive material, but also how fatal even very small amounts of ingested radioactive powder can be. This raises worries of terrorists using powdered alpha emitting material, that if ingested can pose a serious health risk, as in the case of Alexander Litvinenko, who was poisoned by tea with polonium-210. "Smoky bombs" based on alpha emitters might be just as dangerous as beta or gamma emitting dirty bombs.

== Public perception of risks ==
Although the exposure might be minimal, many people find radiation exposure especially frightening because it is something they cannot see or feel, and it therefore becomes an unknown source of danger. When United States Attorney General John Ashcroft on June 10, 2002, announced the arrest of José Padilla, allegedly plotting to detonate such a weapon, he said:

[A] radioactive "dirty bomb" ... spreads radioactive material that is highly toxic to humans and can cause mass death and injury.

— Attorney General John Ashcroft

This public fear of radiation also plays a big role in why the costs of a radiological dispersal device impact on a major metropolitan area (such as Lower Manhattan) might be equal to or even larger than that of the 9/11 attacks. Assuming the radiation levels are not too high and the area does not need to be abandoned such as the town of Pripyat near the Chernobyl reactor, an expensive and time-consuming cleanup procedure will begin. This will mainly consist of tearing down highly contaminated buildings, digging up contaminated soil and quickly applying sticky substances to remaining surfaces so that radioactive particles adhere before radioactivity penetrates the building materials. These procedures are the current state of the art for radioactive contamination cleanup, but some experts say that a complete cleanup of external surfaces in an urban area to current decontamination limits may not be technically feasible. Loss of working hours will be vast during cleanup, but even after the radiation levels reduce to an acceptable level, there might be residual public fear of the site including possible unwillingness to conduct business as usual in the area. Tourist traffic is likely never to resume.

== Dirty bombs and terrorism ==
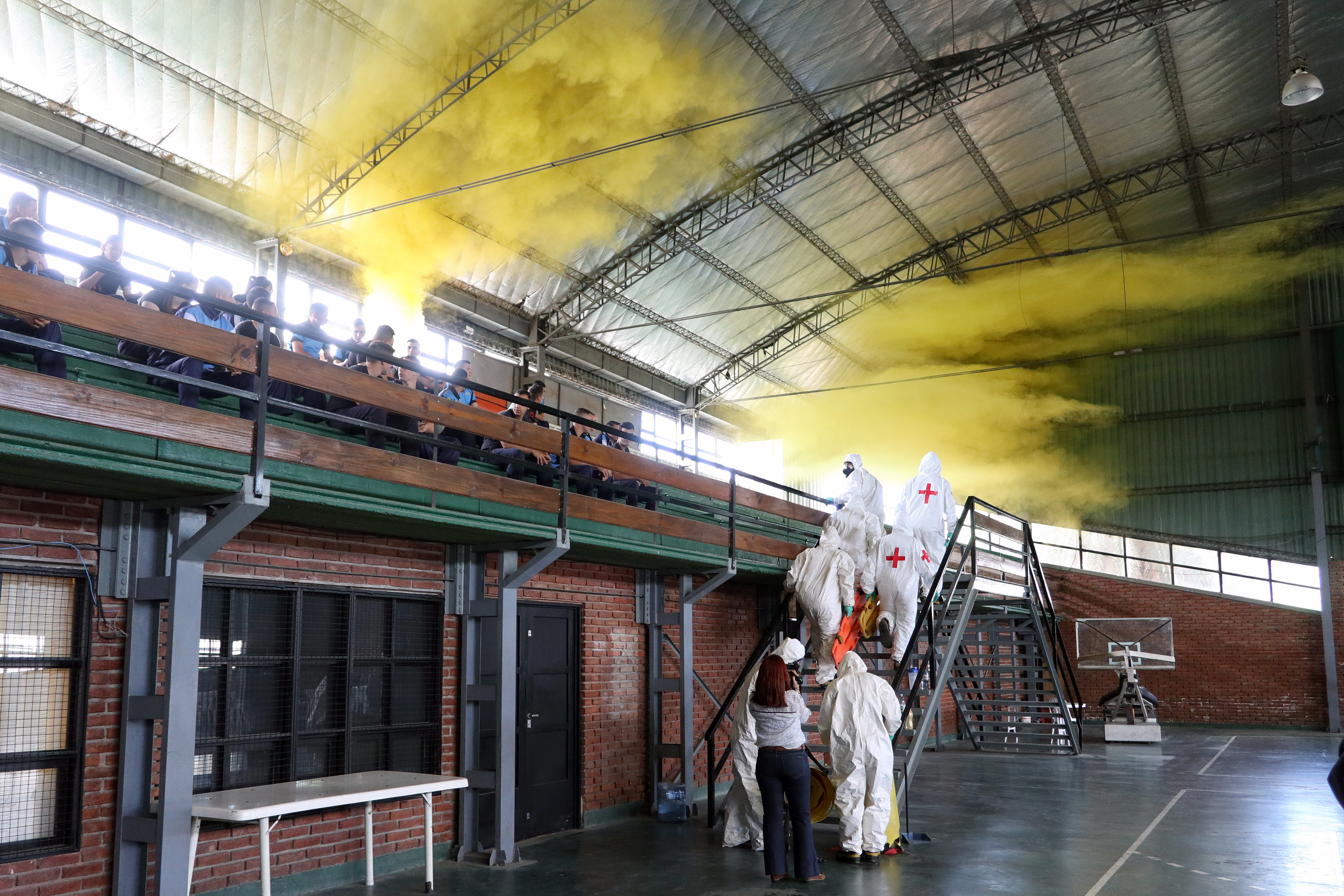
2018 exercise by the International Atomic Energy Agency simulating a dirty bomb attack.

Since the 9/11 attacks, the fear of terrorist groups using dirty bombs has increased, which has been frequently reported in the media. The meaning of terrorism used here, is described by the U.S. Department of Defense's definition, which is "the calculated use of unlawful violence or threat of unlawful violence to inculcate fear; intended to coerce or to intimidate governments or societies in the pursuit of goals that are generally political, religious, or ideological."

=== Constructing and obtaining material for a dirty bomb ===
In order for a terrorist organization to construct and detonate a dirty bomb, it must acquire radioactive material. Possible radiological dispersal device material could come from the millions of radioactive sources used worldwide in the industry, for medical purposes and in academic applications mainly for research. Of these sources, only nine reactor-produced isotopes stand out as being suitable for radiological terror: americium-241, californium-252, caesium-137, cobalt-60, iridium-192, plutonium-238, polonium-210, radium-226 and strontium-90, and even from these it is possible that radium-226 and polonium-210 do not pose a significant threat. Of these sources the U.S. Nuclear Regulatory Commission has estimated that within the U.S., approximately one source is lost, abandoned or stolen every day of the year. Within the European Union the annual estimate is 70. There exist thousands of such "orphan" sources scattered throughout the world, but of those reported lost, no more than an estimated 20 percent can be classified as potential high security concerns if used in a radiological dispersal device. Russia is believed to house thousands of orphan sources, which were lost following the collapse of the Soviet Union. A large but unknown number of these sources probably belong to the high security risk category. These include the beta-emitting strontium-90 sources used as radioisotope thermoelectric generators for beacons in lighthouses in remote areas of Russia. In December 2001, three Georgian woodcutters stumbled over such a power generator and dragged it back to their camp site to use it as a heat source. Within hours they suffered from acute radiation sickness and sought hospital treatment. The International Atomic Energy Agency (IAEA) later stated that it contained approximately 40 kilocuries (1.5 PBq) of strontium, equivalent to the amount of radioactivity released immediately after the Chernobyl accident (though the total radioactivity release from Chernobyl was 2500 times greater at around 100 MCi (3,700 PBq)).

Although a terrorist organization might obtain radioactive material through the "black market", and there has been a steady increase in illicit trafficking of radioactive sources from 1996 to 2004, these recorded trafficking incidents mainly refer to rediscovered orphan sources without any sign of criminal activity, and it has been argued that there is no conclusive evidence for such a market. In addition to the hurdles of obtaining usable radioactive material, there are several conflicting requirements regarding the properties of the material the terrorists need to take into consideration: First, the source should be "sufficiently" radioactive to create direct radiological damage at the explosion or at least to perform societal damage or disruption. Second, the source should be transportable with enough shielding to protect the carrier, but not so much that it will be too heavy to maneuver. Third, the source should be sufficiently dispersible to effectively contaminate the area around the explosion.

=== Possibility of use by terrorist groups ===
The first attempt of radiological terror was reportedly carried out in November 1995 by a group of Chechen separatists, who buried a caesium-137 source wrapped in explosives at the Izmaylovsky Park in Moscow. A Chechen rebel leader alerted the media, the bomb was never activated, and the incident amounted to a mere publicity stunt. In December 1998, a second attempt was announced by the Chechen Security Service, who discovered a container filled with radioactive materials attached to an explosive mine. The bomb was hidden near a railway line in the suburban area Argun, ten miles east of the Chechen capital of Grozny. The same Chechen separatist group was suspected to be involved.

On 8 May 2002, José Padilla (a.k.a. Abdulla al-Muhajir) was arrested on suspicion that he was an al-Qaeda terrorist planning to detonate a dirty bomb in the U.S. This suspicion was raised by information obtained from an arrested terrorist in U.S. custody, Abu Zubaydah, who under interrogation revealed that the organization was close to constructing a dirty bomb. Although Padilla had not obtained radioactive material or explosives at the time of arrest, law enforcement authorities uncovered evidence that he was on reconnaissance for usable radioactive material and possible locations for detonation. It has been doubted whether José Padilla was preparing such an attack, and it has been claimed that the arrest was highly politically motivated, given the pre-9/11 security lapses by the CIA and FBI.

In 2006, Dhiren Barot from North London pleaded guilty of conspiring to murder people in the United Kingdom and United States using a radioactive dirty bomb. He planned to target underground car parks within the UK and buildings in the U.S. such as the International Monetary Fund, World Bank buildings in Washington D.C., the New York Stock Exchange, Citigroup buildings and the Prudential Financial buildings in Newark, New Jersey. He also faces 12 other charges including, conspiracy to commit public nuisance, seven charges of making a record of information for terrorist purposes and four charges of possessing a record of information for terrorist purposes. Experts say if the plot to use the dirty bomb was carried out "it would have been unlikely to cause deaths, but was designed to affect about 500 people".

In January 2009, a leaked FBI report described the results of a search of the Maine home of James G. Cummings, a white supremacist who had been shot and killed by his wife. Investigators found four one-gallon containers of 35 percent hydrogen peroxide, uranium, thorium, lithium metal, aluminium powder, beryllium, boron, black iron oxide and magnesium as well as literature on how to build dirty bombs and information about caesium-137, strontium-90 and cobalt-60, radioactive materials. Officials confirmed the veracity of the report but stated that the public was never at risk.

In July 2014, ISIS militants seized 88 pounds (40 kg) of uranium compounds from Mosul University. The material was unenriched and so could not be used to build a conventional fission bomb, but a dirty bomb was a theoretical possibility. Nonetheless, uranium's relatively low radioactivity makes it a poor candidate for use in a dirty bomb.

Terrorist organizations may also capitalize on the fear of radiation to create weapons of mass disruption rather than weapons of mass destruction. A fearful public response may in itself accomplish the goals of a terrorist organization to gain publicity or destabilize society. Even simply stealing radioactive materials may trigger a panic reaction from the general public. Similarly, a small-scale release of radioactive materials or a threat of such a release may be considered sufficient for a terror attack. Particular concern is directed towards the medical sector and healthcare sites, which are "intrinsically more vulnerable than conventional licensed nuclear sites". Opportunistic attacks may range to even kidnapping patients whose treatment involve radioactive materials. In the Goiânia accident, over 100,000 people admitted themselves to monitoring, while only 49 were admitted to hospitals. Other benefits to a terrorist organization of a dirty bomb include economic disruption in the area affected, abandonment of affected assets (such a buildings, subways) due to public concern, and international publicity useful for recruitment.

== Tests ==
Israel carried out a four-year series of tests on nuclear explosives to measure the effects were hostile forces ever to use them against Israel, Haaretz reported in 2015. According to the report, high-level radiation was measured only at the center of the explosions, while the level of dispersal of radiation by particles carried by the wind (fallout) was low. The bombs reportedly did not pose a significant danger beyond their psychological effect.

== Detection and prevention ==
Dirty bombs may be prevented by detecting illicit radioactive materials in shipping with tools such as a Radiation Portal Monitor. Similarly, unshielded radioactive materials may be detected at checkpoints by Geiger counters, gamma-ray detectors, and even Customs and Border Patrol (CBS) pager-sized radiation detectors. Hidden materials may also be detected by x-ray inspection and heat emitted may be picked up by infrared detectors. Such devices, however, may be circumvented by simply transporting materials across unguarded stretches of coastline or other barren border areas.

One proposed method for detecting shielded Dirty Bombs is Nanosecond Neutron Analysis (NNA). Designed originally for the detection of explosives and hazardous chemicals, NNA is also applicable to fissile materials. NNA determines what chemicals are present in an investigated device by analyzing emitted γ-emission neutrons and α-particles created from a reaction in the neutron generator. The system records the temporal and spatial displacement of the neutrons and α-particles within separate 3D regions. A prototype dirty-bomb detection device created with NNA is demonstrated to be able to detect uranium from behind a 5 cm-thick lead wall. Other radioactive material detectors include Radiation Assessment and Identification (RAID) and Sensor for Measurement and Analysis of Radiation Transients, both developed by Sandia National Laboratories. Sodium iodide scintillator based aerial radiation detection systems are capable to detect International Atomic Energy Agency (IAEA) defined dangerous quantities of radioactive material and have been deployed by the New York City Police Department (NYPD) Counterterrorism Bureau.

The IAEA recommends certain devices be used in tandem at country borders to prevent transfer of radioactive materials, and thus the building of dirty bombs. They define the four main goals of radiation detection instruments as detection, verification, assessment and localization, and identification as a means to escalate a potential radiological situation. The IAEA also defines the following types of instruments:

- Pocket-Type Instruments: these instruments provide a low-power, mobile option to detection that allows for security officers to passively scan an area for radioactive materials. These devices should be easily worn, should have an alarm threshold of three times normal radiation levels, and should have a long battery life - over 800 hours.
- Handheld Instruments: these instruments may be used to detect all types of radiation (including neutron) and may be used to search specific targets flexibly. These instruments should aim for ease of use and speed, ideally weighing less than 2 kg and being able to make measurements in less than a second.
- Fixed, installed instruments: these instruments provide a continuous, automatic detection system that can monitor pedestrians and vehicles that pass through. To work effectively pedestrians and vehicles should be led close to the detectors, as performance is directly related to range.

Legislative and regulatory actions can also be used to prevent access to materials needed to create a dirty bomb. Examples include the 2006 U.S. Dirty Bomb Bill, the Yucca Flats proposal, and the Nunn-Lungar act. Similarly, close monitoring and restrictions of radioactive materials may provide security for materials in vulnerable private-sector applications, most notably in the medical sector where such materials are used for treatments. Suggestions for increased security include isolation of materials in remote locations and strict limitation of access.

One way to mitigate a major effect of a radiological weapons may also be to educate the public on the nature of radioactive materials. As one of the major concerns of a dirty bomb is the public panic proper education may prove a viable counter-measure. Education on radiation is considered by some to be "the most neglected issue related to radiological terrorism".

== Personal safety ==
The dangers of a dirty bomb come from the initial blast and the radioactive materials To mitigate the risk of radiation exposure, FEMA suggests the following guidelines:

- Covering the mouth/nose with cloth to reduce risk of breathing in radioactive materials.
- Avoiding touching materials touched by the explosion.
- Quickly relocating inside to shield from radiation.
- Remove and pack up clothes. Keep clothes until instructed by authorities how to dispose of them.
- Keep radioactive dust outside.
- Remove all dust possible by showering with soap and water.
- Avoid taking potassium iodide, as it only prevents effects from radioactive iodine and may instead cause a dangerous reaction.

== Treatment ==
As of 2023, research is under way to find radioactive decontanimation drugs to remove radioactive elements from the body. One drug candidate under investigation is HOPO 14-1.

== Other uses of the term ==
The term has also been used historically to refer to certain types of nuclear weapons. Due to the inefficiency of early nuclear weapons, only a small amount of the nuclear material would be consumed during the explosion. Little Boy had an efficiency of only 1.4%. Fat Man, which used a different design and a different fissile material, had an efficiency of 14%. Thus, they tended to disperse large amounts of unused fissile material, and the fission products, which are on average much more dangerous, in the form of nuclear fallout. During the 1950s, there was considerable debate over whether "clean" bombs could be produced and these were often contrasted with "dirty" bombs. "Clean" bombs were often a stated goal and scientists and administrators said that high-efficiency nuclear weapon design could create explosions that generated almost all of their energy in the form of nuclear fusion, which does not create harmful fission products.

But the Castle Bravo accident of 1954, in which a thermonuclear weapon produced a large amount of fallout that was dispersed among human populations, suggested that this was not what was actually being used in modern thermonuclear weapons, which derive around half of their yield from a final fission stage of the fast fissioning of the uranium tamper of the secondary. While some proposed producing "clean" weapons, other theorists noted that one could make a nuclear weapon intentionally "dirty" by "salting" it with a material, which would generate large amounts of long-lasting fallout when irradiated by the weapon core. These are known as salted bombs; a specific subtype often noted is a cobalt bomb.

== In popular culture ==
- In the 2018 video game Detroit: Become Human, numerous endings depict Markus, one of three playable android characters in the game, setting off a cobalt-derived dirty bomb in southern Detroit to force the retreat of authorities.
- In the fifth episode of the first season of the NBC crime drama, Blindspot, the FBI tracks down a terrorist who has constructed a dirty bomb.
- The film Dirty War is centered around the detonation of a dirty bomb in London

== See also ==
- Broken Arrow (nuclear)
- Crimes involving radioactive substances
- Improvised nuclear device
- Lists of nuclear disasters and radioactive incidents
- Nuclear and radiation accidents and incidents
- Nuclear terrorism
- Nuclear warfare
- Nuclear weapon design
- Operation Groundhog
- Radiation poisoning
- Radiological warfare
- Salted bomb
