= Pit (nuclear weapon) =

Core of a nuclear implosion weapon

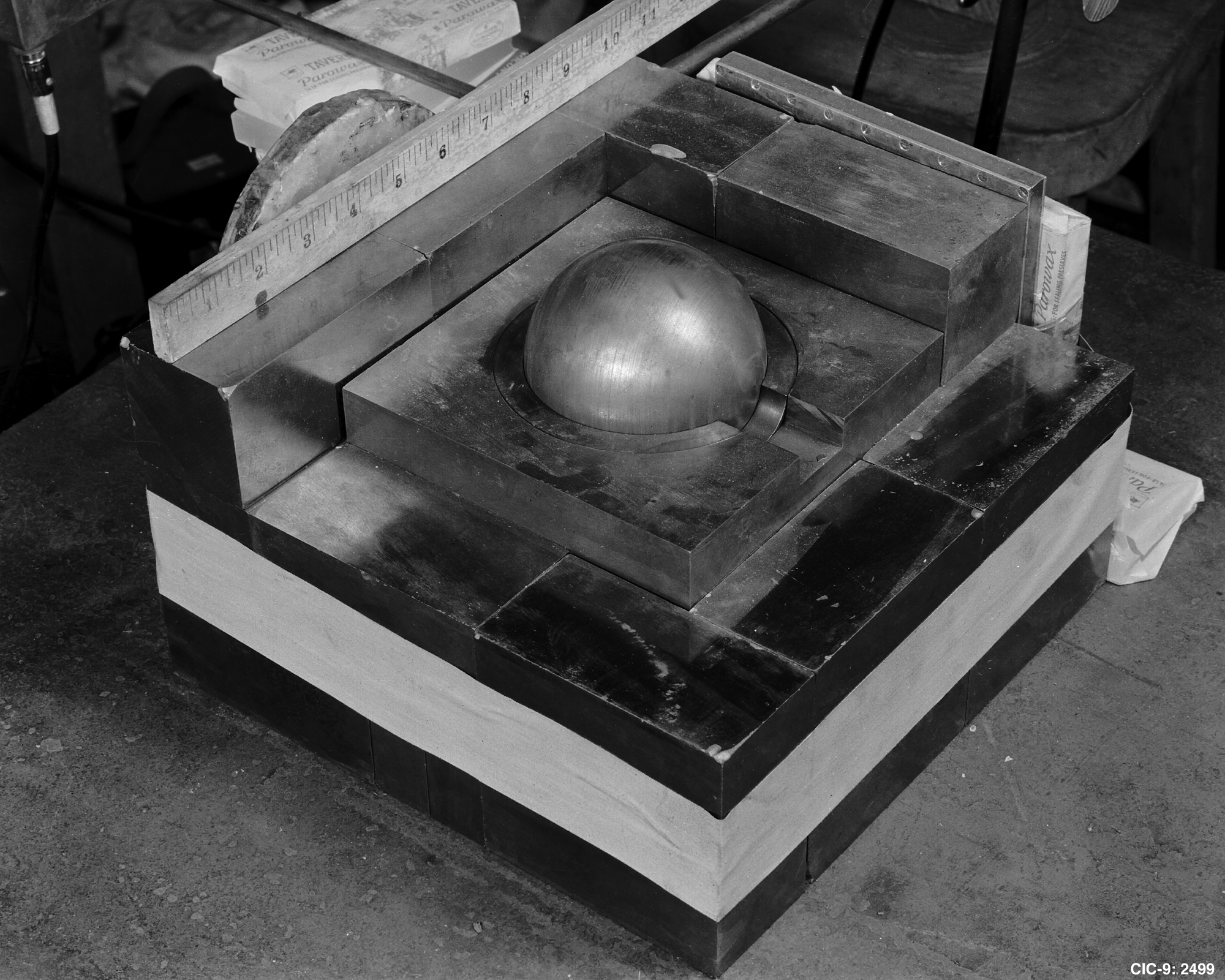
The "demon core": re-creation of the configuration used in the fatal 1945 criticality accident with a sphere of plutonium surrounded by neutron-reflecting tungsten carbide blocks

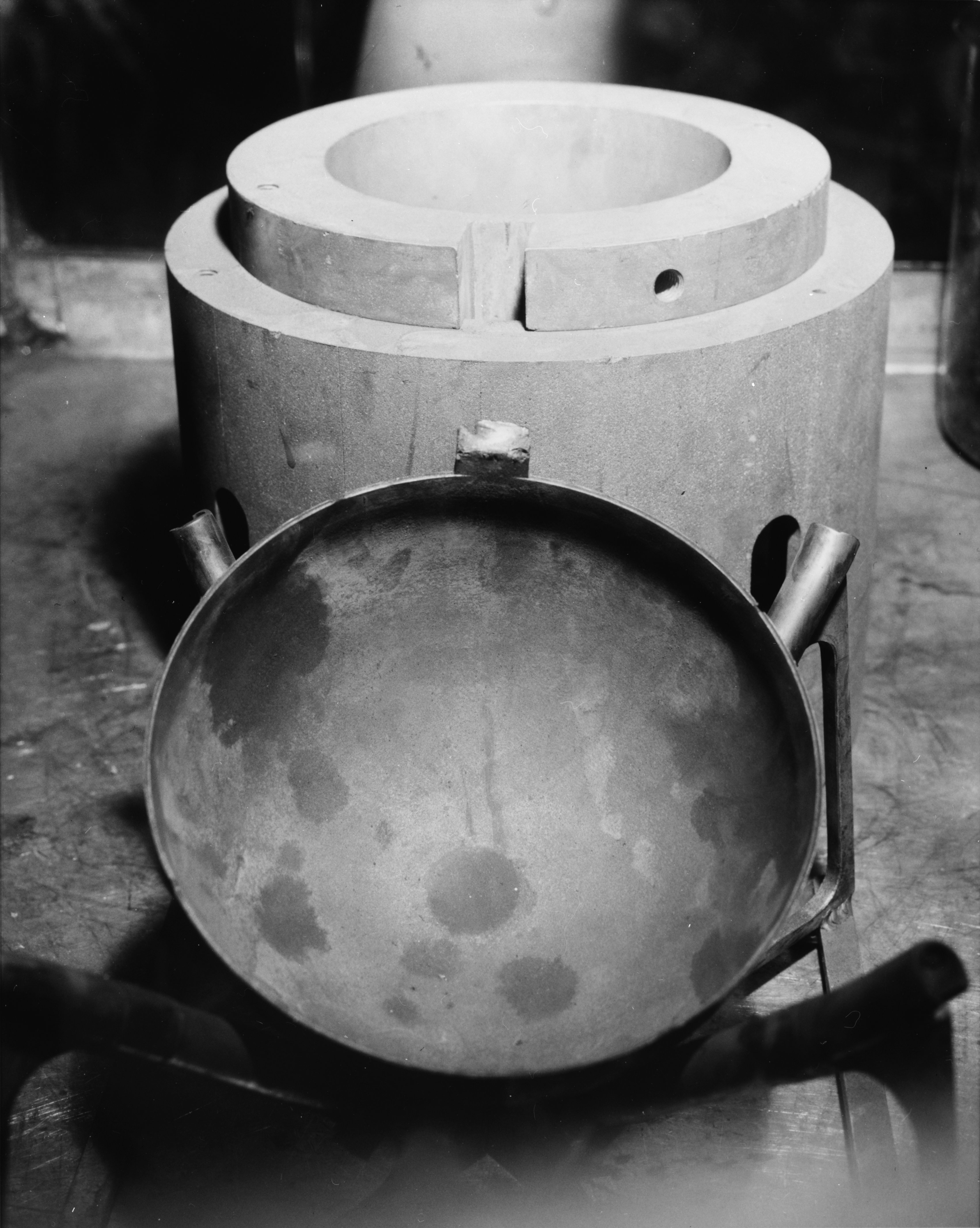
Precision plutonium foundry mold, 1959

In nuclear weapon design, the pit is the core of an implosion nuclear weapon, consisting of fissile material and any neutron reflector or tamper bonded to it. Early pits were spherical, while most modern pits are prolate spheroidal. Some weapons tested during the 1950s used pits made with uranium-235 alone, or as a composite with plutonium. All-plutonium pits are the smallest in diameter and have been the standard since the early 1960s. The pit is named after the hard core found in stonefruit such as peaches and apricots.

== Designs ==
The pits of the first nuclear weapons were solid, with an urchin neutron initiator in their center. The Gadget and Fat Man used pits made of 6.2 kg of solid hot pressed plutonium–gallium alloy (at 400 °C and 200 MPa in steel dies – 750 °F and 29,000 psi) half-spheres of 9.2 cm (3.6 in) diameter, with a 2.5 cm (1 in) internal cavity for the initiator. The Gadget's pit was electroplated with 0.13 mm of silver because of plutonium's susceptibility to corrosion in air. This layer, however, developed blisters, which had to be ground off. These gaps were then patched with gold leaf before the test. The Fat Man pit, and those of subsequent models, were all plated with nickel. A hollow pit was considered and known to be more efficient but ultimately rejected due to higher requirements for implosion accuracy.

Later designs used TOM initiators of similar design but with diameters of only about 1 cm (3/8 in). The internal neutron initiators were later phased out and replaced with pulsed neutron sources, and with boosted fission weapons.

The solid-cores were known as the "Christy" design, after Robert Christy who made the solid pit design a reality after it was initially proposed by Edward Teller. Along with the pit, the whole physics package was also informally nicknamed "Christy['s] Gadget".

=== Levitated pits ===
Efficiency of the implosion can be increased by leaving an empty space between the tamper and the pit, causing a rapid acceleration of the shock wave before it impacts the pit. This method is known as levitated-pit implosion. Levitated pits were tested in 1948 with Fat Man style bombs (Mark IV). The early weapons with a levitated pit had a removable pit, called an open pit. It was stored separately, in a special capsule called a birdcage.

=== Hollow pits ===
During implosion of a hollow pit, the plutonium layer accelerates inwards, colliding in the middle and forming a supercritical highly dense sphere. Due to the added momentum, the plutonium itself plays part of the role of the tamper, requiring a smaller amount of uranium in the tamper layer, reducing the warhead weight and size. Hollow pits are more efficient than solid ones but require more accurate implosion; solid "Christy" pits were therefore favored for the first weapon designs. Following the war's end in August 1945, the laboratory focused on the problem of the hollow pit again, and for the rest of the year they were headed by Hans Bethe, Christy's group leader and successor to the theoretical division, with the hollow composite core being of greatest interest, due to the cost of plutonium and trouble ramping up the Hanford reactors.

The efficiency of the hollow pits can be further increased by injecting a 50%/50% mixture of deuterium and tritium into the cavity immediately before the implosion, so called "fusion boosting"; this also lowers the minimum amount of plutonium for achieving a successful explosion. The higher degree of control of the initiation, both by the amount of deuterium-tritium mixture injection and by timing and intensity of the neutron pulse from the external generator, facilitated the design of variable yield weapons.

=== Composite cores and uranium pits ===
In the early period of nuclear weapons development, the plutonium-239 supply was scarce. To lower its amount needed for a pit, a composite core was developed, where a hollow shell of plutonium was surrounded with an outer shell of then more plentiful highly enriched uranium. The composite cores were available for Mark 3 nuclear bombs by the end of 1947. For example, a composite core for a US Mark 4 bomb, the 49-LCC-C core was made of 2.5 kg of plutonium and 5 kg of uranium. Its explosion releases only 35% of energy of the plutonium and 25% of the uranium, so it is not highly efficient, but the weight saving of plutonium is significant.

Another factor for considering different pit materials is the different behavior of plutonium and uranium. Plutonium fissions faster and produces more neutrons, but it was then more expensive to produce, and scarce due to limitations of the available reactors. Uranium is slower to fission, so it can be assembled into a more supercritical mass, allowing higher yield of the weapon. A composite core was considered as early as of July 1945, and composite cores became available in 1946. The priority for Los Alamos then was the design of an all-uranium pit. The new pit designs were tested by the Operation Sandstone.

The plutonium-only core, with its high background neutron rate, had a high probability of predetonation, with reduced yield. Minimizing this probability required a smaller mass of plutonium, which limited the achievable yield to about 10 kt, or using highly pure plutonium-239 with impractically low level of plutonium-240 contamination. The advantage of the composite core was the possibility to maintain higher yields while keeping predetonation risk low, and to utilize both available fissile materials. The yield limitation was rendered irrelevant in the mid-1950s with the advent of fusion boosting, and later with using of fusion weapons.

The yield of a weapon can also be controlled by selecting among a choice of pits. For example, the Mark 4 nuclear bomb could be equipped with three different pits: 49-LTC-C (levitated uranium-235, tested in the Zebra test on 14 May 1948), 49-LCC-C (levitated composite uranium-plutonium), and 50-LCC-C (levitated composite). This approach is not suitable for field selectability of the yield of the more modern weapons with nonremovable pits, but allows production of multiple weapon subtypes with different yields for different tactical uses. The early US designs were based on standardized Type C and Type D pit assemblies. The Mark 4 bomb used the Type C and Type D pits, which were insertable manually in flight. The Mark 5 bomb used Type D pits, with automated in-flight insertion; the W-5 warhead used the same. Its successor, the Mark 6 bomb, was compatible with all but one of its pits.

The pit can be composed of plutonium-239, plutonium-239/uranium-235 composite, or uranium-235 only. Plutonium is the most common choice, but e.g. the Violet Club bomb and Orange Herald warhead used massive hollow pits, consisting of 87 and 117 kg (98 and 125 kg according to other sources) of highly enriched uranium. The Green Grass fission core consisted of a sphere of highly enriched uranium, with an inner diameter of 560 mm, a wall thickness of 3.6 mm and a mass of 70–86 kg; the pit was completely supported by the surrounding natural uranium tamper. Such massive pits, consisting of more than one critical mass of fissile material, present a significant safety risk, as even an asymmetrical detonation of the implosion shell may cause a kiloton-range explosion. The largest-yield pure-fission weapon, the 500-kiloton Mark 18 nuclear bomb, used a hollow pit composed of more than 60 kg of highly enriched uranium, about four critical masses; the safing was done with an aluminium–boron chain inserted in the pit.

A composite pit of plutonium and uranium-233, based on the plutonium-U235 core from TX-7E Mark 7 nuclear bomb, was tested in 1955 during the Operation Teapot in the MET test. The yield was 22 kilotons instead of the expected 33 kilotons.

=== Sealed pits ===
A sealed pit means that a solid metal barrier is formed around the pit inside a nuclear weapon, with no openings. This protects the nuclear materials from environmental degradation and helps reduce the chances of their release in case of an accidental fire or minor explosion. The first US weapon employing a sealed pit was the W25 warhead. The metal is often stainless steel, but beryllium, aluminium, and possibly vanadium are also used. Beryllium is brittle, toxic, and expensive, but is an attractive choice due to its role as a neutron reflector, lowering the needed critical mass of the pit. There is probably a layer of interface metal between plutonium and beryllium, capturing the alpha particles from decay of plutonium (and americium and other contaminants) which would otherwise react with the beryllium and produce neutrons. Beryllium tampers/reflectors came into use in the mid-1950s; the parts were machined from pressed-powder beryllium blanks in the Rocky Flats Plant.

More modern plutonium pits are hollow. An often-cited specification applicable to some modern pits describes a hollow sphere of a suitable structural metal, of the approximate size and weight of a bowling ball, with a channel for injection of tritium (in the case of boosted fission weapons), with the internal surface lined with plutonium. The principal factors influencing the weapon properties are the pit's size (usually between a bowling ball and a tennis ball), accuracy of sphericity, weight and isotopic composition of the fissile material, and are often classified. The hollow pits can be made of half shells with three joint welds around the equator, and a tube brazed (to beryllium or aluminium shell) or electron beam or TIG-welded (to stainless steel shell) for injection of the boost gas. Beryllium-clad pits are more vulnerable to fracture, more sensitive to temperature fluctuations, more likely to require cleaning, susceptible to corrosion with chlorides and moisture, and can expose workers to toxic beryllium.

Newer pits contain about 3 kilograms of plutonium. Older pits used about 4–5 kilograms.

=== Linear implosion pits ===
Further miniaturization was achieved by linear implosion. An elongated subcritical solid pit, reshaped into a supercritical spherical shape by two opposite shock waves, and later a hollow pit with more precisely shaped shock waves, allowed construction of relatively very small nuclear warheads. The configuration was, however, considered prone to accidental high-yield detonation should the explosive get accidentally initiated, unlike a spherical implosion assembly where asymmetric implosion destroys the weapon without triggering a nuclear detonation. This necessitated special design precautions, and a series of safety tests, including one-point safety.

=== Pit sharing between weapons ===
Pits can be shared between weapon designs. For example, the W89 warhead is said to reuse pits from the W68s. Many pit designs are standardized and shared between different physics packages; the same physics packages are often used in different warheads. Pits can be also reused; the sealed pits extracted from disassembled weapons are commonly stockpiled for direct reuse. Due to low aging rates of the plutonium-gallium alloy, the shelf life of pits is estimated to be a century or more. The oldest pits in the US arsenal are still less than 50 years old.

The sealed pits can be classified as bonded or non-bonded. Non-bonded pits can be disassembled mechanically; a lathe is sufficient for separating the plutonium. Recycling of bonded pits requires chemical processing.

Pits of modern weapons are said to have radii of about 5 centimeters (2.0 in).

== Weapons and pit types ==
US weapon pits
Design lab	Weapon	Pit type	Status	Comment
LANL	B61-3,10	123	Enduring Stockpile	
LANL	B61-7,11	125	Enduring Stockpile	
LANL	B61-4	118	Enduring Stockpile	
LANL	W76	116	Enduring Stockpile	Most heat-sensitive LANL design
LANL	W78	117	Enduring Stockpile	
LANL	W80	124	Enduring Stockpile	Responsibility being transferred to LLNL
LANL	W80	119	Enduring Stockpile	
LANL	W80-0		Enduring Stockpile	Supergrade plutonium, low radiation, for naval use.
LANL	W88	126	Enduring Stockpile	
LLNL	B83	MC3350	Enduring Stockpile	Heaviest pit, fire-resistant pit
LLNL	W62	MC2406	Enduring Stockpile	
LLNL	W84	?	Enduring Stockpile	Fire-resistant pit
LLNL	W87	MC3737	Enduring Stockpile	Fire-resistant pit
LANL	B28	83	Retired	
LANL	B28-0	93	Retired	Minimum decay heat. W28-0 used internal initiation while later B28 mods used external initiation, likely explaining the different pit.
LANL	B43	79	Retired	Beryllium-clad
LANL	B43-1	101	Retired	Beryllium-clad
LANL	W44	74	Retired	Beryllium-clad
LANL	W44-1	100	Retired	Beryllium-clad
LANL	W50-1	103	Retired	
LANL	B53	76	Retired	All-uranium pit
LANL	W54	81	Retired	Require cleaning before long-term storage
LANL	W54-1	96	Retired	Require cleaning before long-term storage
LANL	B57	104	Retired	
LANL	W59	90	Retired	
LANL	B61-0	110	Retired	
LANL	B61-2,5	114	Retired	
LANL	W66	112	Retired	
LANL	W69	111	Retired	
LANL	W85	128	Retired	
LLNL	W38	MC1377	Retired	
LLNL	W45	MC1807	Retired	
LLNL	W47	MC1218	Retired	
LLNL	W48	MC1397	Retired	Beryllium-clad, require cleaning before long-term storage
LLNL	W55	MC1324	Retired	Suspected to be beryllium-clad
LLNL	W56	MC1801	Retired	High radiation, require cleaning before long-term storage
LLNL	W58	MC1493	Retired	
LLNL	W62	MC1978	Retired	
LLNL	W63	MC2056	Retired	
LLNL	W68	MC1978	Retired	
LLNL	W70-0	MC2381	Retired	
LLNL	W70-1	MC2381a	Retired	
LLNL	W70-2	MC2381b	Retired	
LLNL	W70-3	MC2381c	Retired	
LLNL	W71	Unknown	Retired	Require cleaning before long-term storage
LLNL	W79	MC2574	Retired	Suspected to be beryllium-clad

== Safety considerations ==
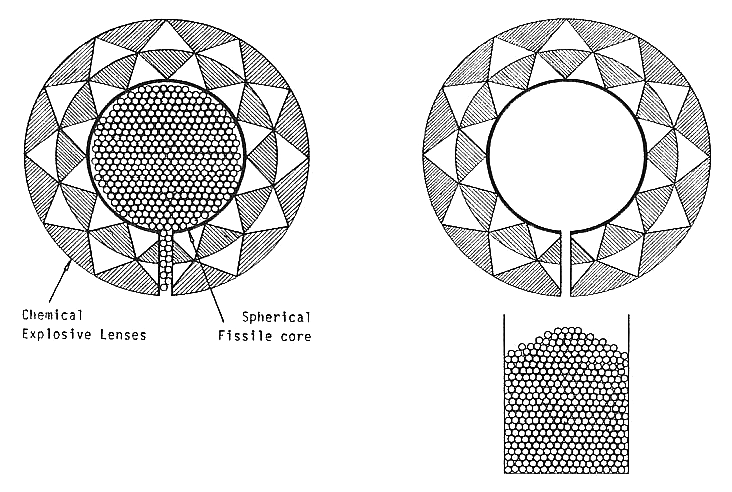
Steel ball safing

One-point safety test

The first weapons had removable pits, which were installed into the bomb shortly before its deployment. The ongoing miniaturization process led to design changes, whereby the pit could be inserted in the factory during the device assembly. This necessitated safety testing to make sure that accidental detonation of the high explosives would not cause a full-scale nuclear explosion; Project 56 was one of such a series of tests.

Accidental high-yield detonation was always a concern. The levitated pit design made it practical to allow in-flight insertion of pits to the bombs, separating the fissile core from the explosives around it. Many cases of accidental bomb losses and explosions therefore led only to dispersal of uranium from the bomb's tamper. Later hollow-pit designs, where there is no space between the pit and the tamper, however, made this impossible.

The pits of earlier weapons had accessible inner cavities. For safety, objects were inserted into the pit and removed only when needed. Some larger pits, e.g. the British Green Grass, had their inner cavity lined with rubber and filled with metal balls; this design was improvised and far from optimal, for example in that subjecting the safed pit with balls inside to vibration, e.g. in an airplane, could lead to its damage. A fine metal chain from a neutron-absorbing material (the same used for reactor control rods, e.g. cadmium), can be used instead. The W47 warhead had its pit filled with a cadmium-boron wire when it was manufactured; on arming the weapon, the wire was pulled out to a spool by a small motor and could not be reinserted. However, the wire tended to become brittle and break during removal, making its complete removal impossible and rendering the warhead a dud.

The switch from solid to hollow pits caused a work safety issue; the larger surface-to-mass ratio led to comparatively higher emission of gamma rays and necessitated the installation of better radiation shielding in the Rocky Flats production facility. The increased amount of rolling and machining required led to higher consumption of machining oil and tetrachloromethane, used for degreasing the parts afterwards and creating a large amount of contaminated waste. The pyrophoric plutonium shavings also posed a risk of self-ignition.

Sealed pits require a different method of safing. Many techniques are used, including Permissive Action Links and strong link weak link systems, designed to fail in case of an accident or improper arming sequence; these include mechanical interlocks, critical parts designed to malfunction in case of fire or impact, etc.

Beryllium cladding, while advantageous technically, poses risk for the weapon plant employees. Machining the tamper shells produces beryllium and beryllium oxide dust; its inhalation can cause berylliosis. By 1996, the US Department of Energy identified more than 50 cases of chronic berylliosis among nuclear industry employees, including three dozen in the Rocky Flats Plant; several died.

After the 1966 Palomares B-52 crash and the 1968 Thule Air Base B-52 crash, the safety of weapons against accidental plutonium dispersal became a concern of US military.

Fire-resistant pits (FRP) are a safety feature of modern nuclear weapons, reducing plutonium dispersal in case of fire. The current pits are designed to contain molten plutonium in temperatures up to 1000 °C, the approximate temperature of a burning aircraft fuel, for several hours. Fire-resistant pits would be of no help in cases where pits were scattered around by an explosion; they are used therefore together with insensitive high explosives, which should be resistant to accidental detonation by impact or fire, and undetonable propellants when used in missiles. Vanadium cladding was tested for design of fire-resistant pits, but it is unknown if it is in use or only experimental. The W87 warhead is an example of a FRP-employing assembly. FRP does not, however, provide protection if the pit cladding is mechanically damaged, and may fail if subjected to missile fuel fire, which has a higher burning temperature (about 2000 °C) than does aircraft fuel. Severe weight and size constraints may preclude the use of both FRP and insensitive explosives. SLBMs, with their size considerations and more energetic and vulnerable fuel, tend to be less safe than ICBMs.

Other energetic materials in the vicinity of the pit also influence its safety. US missile propellants come in two general classes. The class 1.3, fire hazard but very difficult to impossible to detonate; an example is 70% ammonium perchlorate, 16% aluminium, and 14% binder. The class 1.1, both fire and detonation hazard, is a double-base propellant based on cross-linked polymer, containing 52% HMX, 18% nitroglycerine, 18% aluminium, 4% ammonium perchlorate, and 8% binder. The 1.1 propellant has 4% higher specific impulse (about 270 s versus 260 s), giving an 8% longer range for constant burning time. The insensitive high explosives are also less powerful, necessitating larger and heavier warheads, which reduces the missile range – or sacrificing some yield. The safety/performance tradeoff is especially important for e.g. submarines. As of 1990, the Trident SLBMs used both detonable fuel and non-insensitive explosives.

== Material considerations ==
Casting and then machining plutonium is difficult not only because of its toxicity, but because plutonium has many different metallic phases, also known as allotropes. As plutonium cools, changes in phase result in distortion and cracking. This distortion is normally overcome by alloying it with 3–3.5 molar% (0.9–1.0% by weight) gallium, forming a plutonium-gallium alloy, which causes it to take up its delta phase over a wide temperature range. When cooling from molten it then suffers only a single phase change, from epsilon to delta, instead of the four changes it would otherwise pass through. Other trivalent metals would also work, but gallium has a small neutron absorption cross section and helps protect the plutonium against corrosion. A drawback is that gallium compounds themselves are corrosive and so if the plutonium is recovered from dismantled weapons for conversion to plutonium dioxide for power reactors, there is the difficulty of removing the gallium.

Because plutonium is chemically reactive it is common to plate the completed pit with a thin layer of inert metal, which also reduces the toxic hazard. The Gadget used galvanic silver plating; afterwards, nickel deposited from nickel tetracarbonyl vapors was used, but gold is now preferred.

To produce the first pits, hot pressing was used to optimally employ the scarce plutonium. Later designs used machined pits, but turning produces a large amount of waste, both as pyrophoric turnings of plutonium and plutonium-contaminated oils and cutting fluids. The goal for the future is direct casting of the pit. In the absence of nuclear testing, however, the slightly different nature of cast and machined surfaces may cause difficulty to predict performance differences.

=== Corrosion issues ===
Both uranium and plutonium are very susceptible to corrosion. A number of the problem-plagued W47 UGM-27 Polaris warheads had to be replaced after corrosion of the fissile material was discovered during routine maintenance. The W58 pits also suffered corrosion problems. The W45 pit was prone to corrosion that could alter its geometry. The Green Grass pit was also corrosion-prone. The radioactivity of the materials used can also cause radiation corrosion in the surrounding materials. Plutonium is highly susceptible to humidity; moist air increases corrosion rate about 200 times. Hydrogen has a strong catalytic effect on corrosion: its presence can accelerate corrosion rate by 13 orders of magnitude. Hydrogen can be generated from moisture and nearby organic materials (e.g. plastics) by radiolysis. These factors cause issues with stored plutonium, as the volume increase during oxidation can cause rupture of storage containers or deformation of pits.

Contamination of the pit with deuterium and tritium, whether accidental or if filled by design, can cause a hydride corrosion, which manifests as pitting corrosion and a growth of a surface coating of pyrophoric plutonium hydride. It also greatly accelerates the corrosion rates by atmospheric oxygen. Deuterium and tritium also cause hydrogen embrittlement in many materials.

Improper storage can promote corrosion of the pits. The AL-R8 containers used in the Pantex facility for storage of the pits are said to promote instead of hinder corrosion, and tend to corrode themselves. The decay heat released by the pits is also a concern; some pits in storage can reach temperatures as high as 150 °C, and the storage facilities for larger numbers of pits may require active cooling. Humidity control can also present problems for pit storage.

Beryllium cladding can be corroded by some solvents used for cleaning of the pits. Research has shown that trichloroethylene (TCE) causes beryllium corrosion, while trichloroethane (TCA) does not. Pitting corrosion of beryllium cladding is a significant concern during prolonged storage of pits in the Pantex facility.

=== Isotopic composition issues ===
The presence of plutonium-240 in the pit material causes increased production of heat and neutrons, impairs fission efficiency and increases the risk of predetonation and fizzle. Weapon-grade plutonium therefore has plutonium-240 content limited to less than 7%. Supergrade plutonium has less than 4% of the 240 isotope, and is used in systems where the radioactivity is a concern, e.g. in the US Navy weapons which have to share confined spaces on ships and submarines with the crews.

Plutonium-241, commonly comprising about 0.5% of weapon-grade plutonium, decays to americium-241, which is a powerful gamma radiation emitter. After several years, americium builds up in the plutonium metal, leading to increased gamma activity that poses an occupational hazard for workers. Americium should therefore be separated, usually chemically, from newly produced and reprocessed plutonium. However, in around 1967 the Rocky Flats Plant stopped this separation, blending up to 80% of old americium-containing pits directly to the foundry instead, in order to reduce costs and increase productivity; this led to higher exposure of workers to gamma radiation.

=== Aging issues ===
Metallic plutonium, notably in the form of the plutonium-gallium alloy, degrades chiefly by two mechanisms: corrosion, and self-irradiation.

In very dry air, plutonium, despite its high chemical reactivity, forms a passivation layer of plutonium(IV) oxide that slows down the corrosion to about 200 nanometers per year. In moist air, however, this passivation layer is disrupted and the corrosion proceeds at 200 times this rate (0.04 mm/year) at room temperature, and 100,000 times faster (20 mm/year) at 100 °C. Plutonium strips oxygen from water, absorbs the liberated hydrogen and forms plutonium hydride. The hydride layer can grow at up to 20 cm/hour, for thinner shells its formation can be considered almost instant. In presence of water the plutonium dioxide becomes hyperstoichiometric, up to PuO_{2.26}. Plutonium chips can spontaneously ignite; the mechanism involves formation of Pu_{2}O_{3} layer, which then rapidly oxidizes to PuO_{2}, and the liberated heat is sufficient to bring the small particles with low thermal mass to autoignition temperature (about 500 °C).

The self-irradiation occurs as the plutonium undergoes alpha-decay. The decaying atom of plutonium-239 liberates an alpha particle and a uranium-235 nucleus. The alpha particle has an energy of more than 5 MeV and in the metal lattice has range of about 10 micrometers; then it stops, acquires two electrons from nearby atoms, and becomes a helium atom. The contaminant plutonium-241 beta-decays to americium-241, which then alpha-decays to neptunium-237.

The alpha-particles lose most of their energy to electrons, which manifests as heating the material. The heavier uranium nucleus has about 85 keV energy and about three quarters of it deposit as a cascade of atomic displacements; the uranium nucleus itself has the range of about 12 nanometers in the lattice. Each such decay event influences about 20,000 other atoms, 90% of which stay in their lattice site and only are thermally excited, the rest being displaced, resulting in formation of about 2500 Frenkel pairs and a local thermal spike lasting few picoseconds, during which the newly formed defects recombine or migrate. In a typical weapons-grade bulk material, each atom gets displaced in average once per 10 years.

At cryogenic temperatures, where next to no annealing occurs, the α-phase of plutonium expands (swells) during self-irradiation, the δ-phase contracts markedly, and the β-phase contracts slightly. The electrical resistance increases, which indicates the increase of defects in the lattice. All three phases, with sufficient time, converge to amorphous-like state with density averaging at 18.4 g/cm^{3}. At normal temperature, however, most of the damage is annealed away; above 200 K vacancies become mobile and at around 400 K the clusters of interstitials and vacancies recombine, healing the damage. Plutonium stored at non-cryogenic temperatures does not show signs of major macroscopic structural changes after more than 40 years.

After 50 years of storage, a typical sample contains 2000 ppm of helium, 3700 ppm americium, 1700 ppm uranium, and 300 ppm neptunium. One kilogram of material contains 200 cm^{3} of helium, which equals three atmospheres of pressure in the same empty volume. Helium migrates through the lattice similarly to the vacancies, and can be trapped in them. The helium-occupied vacancies can coalesce, forming bubbles and causing swelling. Void-swelling is however more likely than bubble-swelling.

== Production and inspections ==
The Radiation Identification System is among a number of methods developed for nuclear weapons inspections. It allows the fingerprinting of the nuclear weapons so that their identity and status can be verified. Various physics methods are used, including gamma spectroscopy with high-resolution germanium detectors. The 870.7 keV line in the spectrum, corresponding to the first excited state of oxygen-17, indicates the presence of plutonium(IV) oxide in the sample. The age of the plutonium can be established by measuring the ratio of plutonium-241 and its decay product, americium-241. However, even passive measurements of gamma spectrums may be a contentious issue in international weapon inspections, as it allows characterization of materials used e.g. the isotopic composition of plutonium, which can be considered a secret.

Between 1954 and 1989, pits for US weapons were produced at the Rocky Flats Plant; the plant was later closed due to numerous safety issues. The Department of Energy attempted to restart pit production there, but repeatedly failed. In 1993, the DOE relocated beryllium production operations from defunct Rocky Flats Plant to Los Alamos National Laboratory; in 1996 the pit production was also relocated there. The reserve and surplus pits, along with pits recovered from disassembled nuclear weapons, totalling over 12,000 pieces, are stored in the Pantex plant. 5,000 of them, comprising about 15 tons of plutonium, are designated as strategic reserve; the rest is surplus to be withdrawn. The current LANL production of new pits is limited to about 20 pits per year, though NNSA is pushing to increase the production, for the Reliable Replacement Warhead program. The US Congress however has repeatedly declined funding.

Up until around 2010, Los Alamos National Laboratory had the capacity to produce 10 to 20 pits a year. The Chemistry and Metallurgy Research Replacement Facility (CMMR) will expand this capability, but it is not known by how much. An Institute for Defense Analyses report written before 2008 estimated a “future pit production requirement of 125 per year at the CMRR, with a surge capability of 200."

Russia stores the material from decommissioned pits in the Mayak facility.

== Recycling ==
Recovery of plutonium from decommissioned pits can be achieved by numerous means, both mechanical (e.g. removal of cladding by a lathe) and chemical. A hydride method is commonly used; the pit is cut in half, a half of the pit is laid inside-down above a funnel and a crucible in a sealed apparatus, and an amount of hydrogen is injected into the space. The hydrogen reacts with the plutonium producing plutonium hydride, which falls to the funnel and the crucible, where it is melted while releasing the hydrogen. Plutonium can also be converted to a nitride or oxide. Practically all plutonium can be removed from a pit this way. The process is complicated by the wide variety of the constructions and alloy compositions of the pits, and the existence of composite uranium-plutonium pits. Weapons-grade plutonium must also be blended with other materials to alter its isotopic composition enough to hinder its reuse in weapons.

== See also ==
- Beryllium nuclear properties
- Charles Allen Thomas – American chemist (1900–1982)
- Dayton Project
- Edward Condon – American nuclear physicist (1902–1974)
- Eugene Wigner – Hungarian-American physicist and mathematician (1902–1995)
- George Kistiakowsky – Ukrainian-American physical chemistry professor
- James L. Tuck – British physicist (1910–1980)
- Modulated neutron initiator – Neutron source used in some nuclear weapons
- Munroe effect – Explosive with focused effect
- Polonium
- Supergrade plutonium – Isotope of plutonium
- Urchin – Neutron source used in some nuclear weapons
