= W65 (nuclear warhead) =

The W65 was the Lawrence Livermore Lab's competitor for the warhead of the Sprint anti-ballistic missile. Development of the W65 started in October 1965 and was terminated in January 1968 in favor of the Los Alamos W66 design. The W65 was an "enhanced radiation" weapon whose kill mechanism was the neutron flux.
