= W64 (nuclear warhead) =

The W64 nuclear warhead was the Los Alamos Laboratory's entry into a brief competition between Lawrence Livermore Laboratory and Los Alamos to design an "enhanced-radiation" nuclear warhead (i.e., a "neutron bomb") for the United States Army's MGM-52 Lance tactical surface-to-surface missile. In July 1964, both Livermore Labs and Los Alamos started developing competing warheads for the Lance. The Los Alamos design, the W64, was canceled in September 1964 in favor of Livermore's W63. In November 1966, the W63 was canceled in favor of the W70, the model that finally entered production.
