= CMRR =

CMRR may stand for:

- Catskill Mountain Railroad, operators of the former New York Central Railroad Catskill Mountain Branch from Kingston to Phoenicia
- Central Massachusetts Railroad, former railroad forming part of the Boston and Maine Railroad system
- Common-mode rejection ratio, measure of the capability of an instrument to reject a signal that is common to both input leads
- Chemistry and Metallurgy Research Replacement Facility, nuclear facility at Los Alamos National Laboratory
