= Chemistry and Metallurgy Research Replacement Facility =

Nuclear facility at Los Alamos National Laboratory

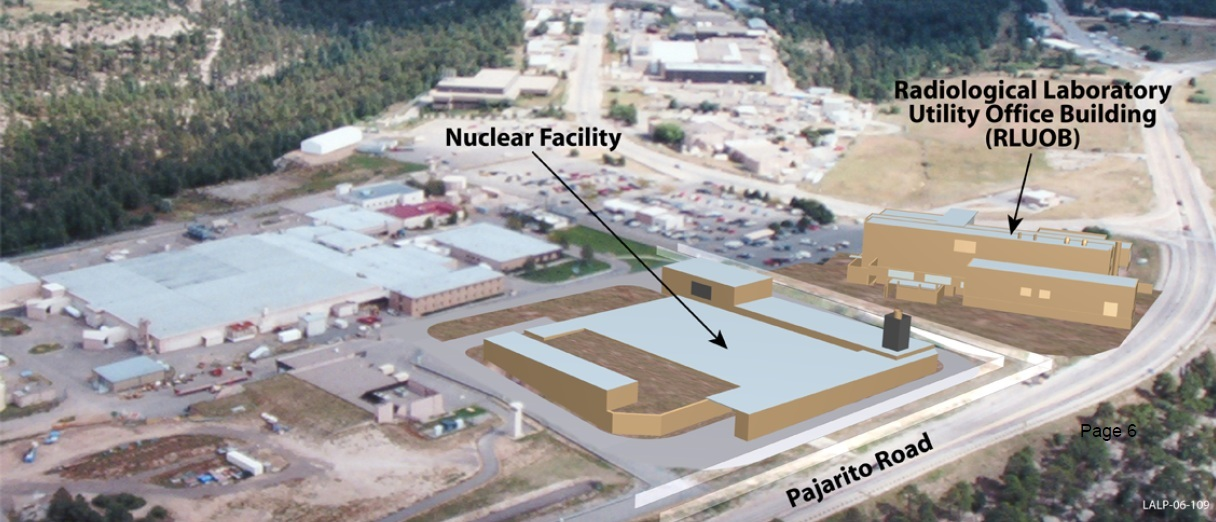
Preliminary designs (2006)

The Chemistry and Metallurgy Research Replacement Facility, usually referred to as the CMRR, is a facility under construction at Los Alamos National Laboratory in New Mexico which is part of the United States' nuclear stockpile stewardship program. The facility will replace the aging Chemistry and Metallurgy Research (CMR) facility. It is located in Technical Area 55 (TA-55) and consists of two buildings: the Nuclear Facility (CMRR-NF) and the Radiological Laboratory, Utility, and Office Building (RLUOB). The two buildings will be linked by tunnels and will connect to LANL's existing 30-year-old plutonium facility PF-4. The facility is controversial both because of spiraling costs and because critics argue it will allow for expanded production of plutonium 'pits' and therefore could be used to manufacture new nuclear weapons.

== Background ==
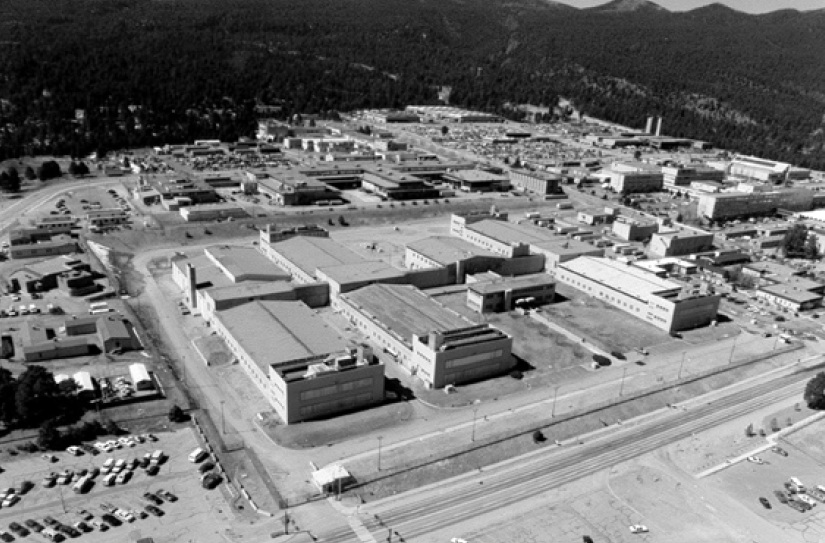
The CMR c. 1952

Construction of the Chemistry and Metallurgy Research (CMR) building began in 1949 and was completed in 1952. The building contained six wings and in 1959 a seventh laboratory wing was added. In 1960, Los Alamos built Wing 9, a 64,000-square-foot (5,900 m^{2}) addition containing hot cells with remote handling capabilities. In total, the CMR building now contains roughly 550,000 square feet (51,000 m^{2}) of laboratories and related facilities.

According to Los Alamos officials, "many of the CMR facility systems and structural components are aged, outmoded, eroding, and generally deteriorating." In 1999, the NNSA decided to plan for the "end-of-life" of the CMR building around 2010. Thereafter planning began for the CMRR facility which would serve as a replacement. There is evidence the need for an upgrade is real, since in 2010 federal safety auditors reported the building was "seismically fragile and poses a continuing risk to workers and the public."

Ground was broken on the CMRR project on January 12, 2006. Construction of the CMRR is proceeding in three phases. The first phase is the construction of the Radiological Laboratory Utility Office Building, which is expected to be finished around 2011. It has an estimated cost of $164 million and will house "a radiological laboratory, a training center, two simulation labs, and cleared and uncleared office space for some 350 Lab personnel". The second phase is the Special Equipment Facility (SPF) and the third phase is the Nuclear Facility (NF).

The initial cost of the CMRR project was approved at $745–$975 Million. The total projected cost in 2008 was reported at $2 billion. In 2010, the total cost of the project was still not finalized but was estimated between $4 and $5 Billion. There is a $4 billion placeholder in the Obama administration's Fiscal Year 2011 budget for the CMRR. In 2010, a top lab manager suggested that the final price tag probably will not be known until 2014. The expected completion date is also unknown but it has been reported the project may not be completed until 2022.

== CMRR-NF ==
The Nuclear Facility portion was expected to be completed around 2014 but has been delayed. It is a very complex building, featuring NNSA Security Category 1 laboratory space and a total of approximately 306 enclosures, 26 fume hoods and 43 sections of Material Transfer System (MTS). The Nuclear Facility will contain a 6-metric ton vault that will approximately triple LANL's plutonium storage capacity. There have been several difficulties in design including earthquake concerns and fail-safe issues regarding plutonium vault design. In particular, security worries called for the facility to be largely underground, but this led to increased seismic worries, which pushed the excavation requirements from 50 feet (15 m) to 125 feet (38 m) and increased the amount of concrete in the foundation to 225,000 cubic yards.

== Controversy ==
Critics argue that the CMRR project is a violation, or has the potential to be a violation, of the Nuclear Non-Proliferation Treaty between the US, China, Russia, Britain and France. Critics also argue that the new facility is unnecessary for maintaining the nuclear stockpile and may be seen as a threatening development because it allows for the production of new types of nuclear weapons. Critics also cite the spiraling costs (mentioned earlier) as a major problem. Greg Mello, the director of the Los Alamos Study Group (LASG), "The dramatic cost escalation at CMRR-NF together with the problem of bringing other facilities into compliance with seismic safety requirements has unquantified cost implications and unknown feasibility." The original cost of the CMRR-NF was estimated at $400 million in 2003 and has grown to a current estimate of $3.7 - $5.8 billion.

Detractors also argue against the un-justified capabilities to produce new plutonium pits, which constitute the core and active component of nuclear weapons. LANL currently has the capacity to produce 10 to 20 pits a year, but this is expected to come to an end with the shut down of the CMR in 2010. The CMRR will expand this capability, but it is not known by how much. An Institute for Defense Analyses report written before 2008 estimated a “future pit production requirement of 125 per year, with a surge capability of 200." The need for pit production is a complex issue, with the government and the military arguing that refurbishment and replacement capabilities are needed. The aging time of pits before refurbishment is needed is still being studied but some believe it is likely around 100 years or more. The U.S. has about 23,000 pits, of which about 10,000 are in weapons and roughly 15,000 are in storage at the Pantex Plant near Amarillo, Texas.

Several protests were held, including a 10-day summer camp in August 2010 called "Disarmament Summer Encampment" held in Los Alamos and organized by the nuclear abolition group Think Outside the Bomb. A non-violent civil disobedience style protest on August 6, 2010 resulted in eight arrests.

On August 16, 2010, the Los Alamos Study Group filed a lawsuit against the Department of Energy (DOE) and the National Nuclear Security Administration (NNSA) which states that the original environmental impact statement (EIS) completed in 2003, with a record of decision (ROD) in 2004, is not a legitimate EIS for the current design and is a direct violation of the NEPA. The lawsuit states that the current CMRR-NF project needs to be halted until a new EIS is studied, accessing the need for this facility and its purpose and studying thoroughly all alternatives, including other locations, upgrading existing facilities, or canceling the project all together. NNSA decided to complete a new "Supplemental Environmental Impact Statement" on the project, but LASG refused to drop the suit. Judge Judith Herrera dismissed the lawsuit on May 23, 2011, saying the case was “prudentially moot” and “not yet ripe”. NNSA officials—without any public review—revamped the design of the CMRR-NF, using what they describe as a multi-functional “hotel concept” that can be used in the future for a range of unspecified nuclear weapons activities. LANL officials were considering using the 400,000 cubic yards of excavated volcanic ash from construction to cap two old waste disposal sites that contain 14 million cubic feet of nuclear and chemical residues. The lawsuit claimed this was a violation of the National Environmental Policy Act and noted "The decision to leave 14 million cubic feet of nuclear and chemical waste in shallow unlined disposal pits covered by this material would be a major federal action significantly affecting the quality of the human environment, with far-reaching impacts."
