= W79 Artillery-Fired Atomic Projectile =

W79
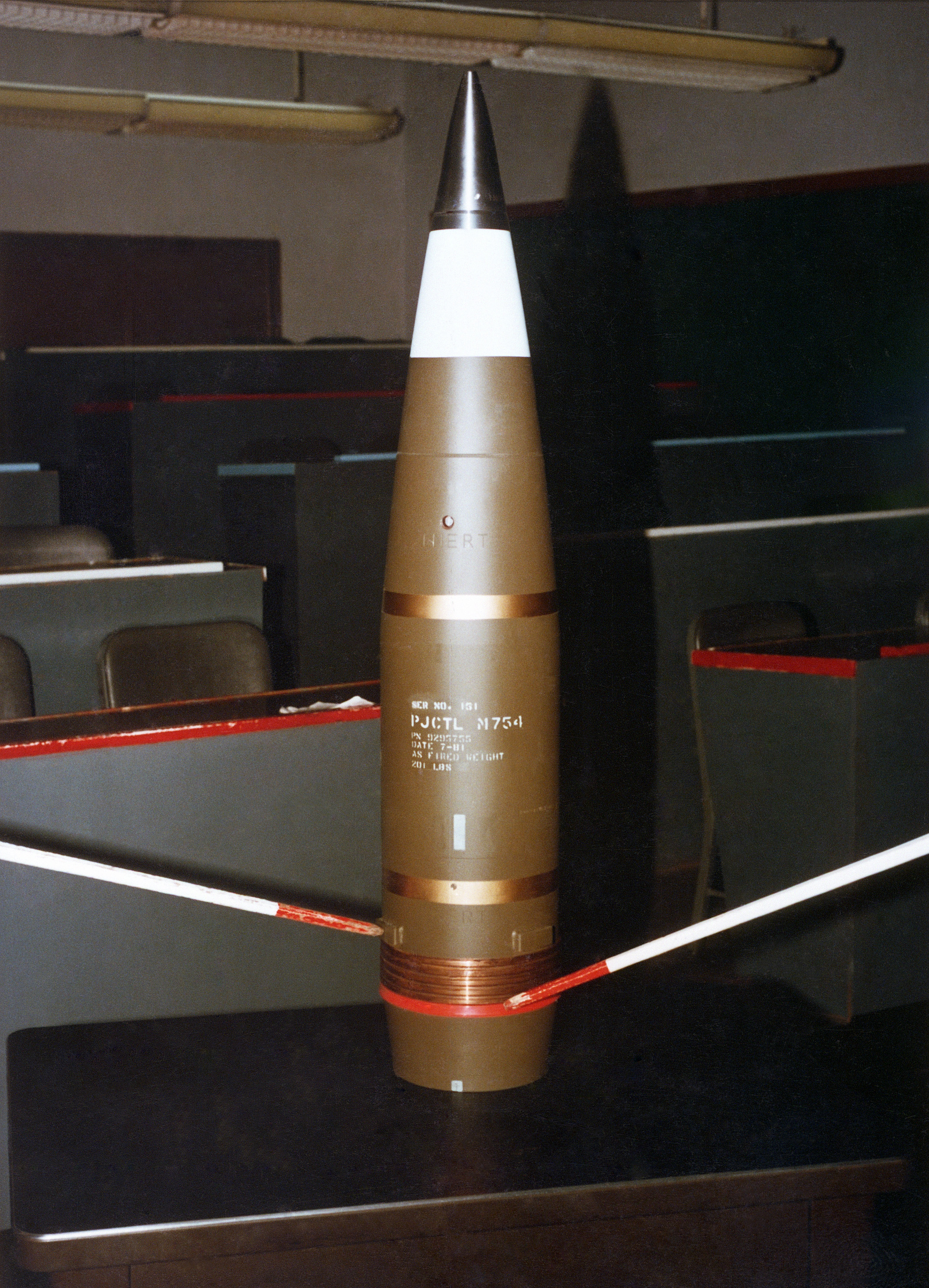
- An inert M754 training version of the warhead
- Type: Nuclear artillery
- Place of origin: United States

Service history
- In service: 1981–1992
- Used by: United States Army

Production history
- Designer: Lawrence Livermore National Laboratory
- Designed: 1975 to 1981

Specifications
- Mass: 200 pounds (91 kg)
- Length: 44 inches (1,100 mm)
- Diameter: 8 inches (203 mm)
- Maximum firing range: 24 kilometres (15 mi) or 30 kilometres (19 mi) with rocket assist
- Blast yield: 0.1 to 1.1 kilotonnes of TNT (0.42 to 4.60 TJ) (Mod 0), 0.8 kilotonnes of TNT (3.3 TJ) (Mod 1)

The W79 Artillery-Fired Atomic Projectile (AFAP), also known as XM753 (Atomic RA), was an American nuclear artillery shell, capable of being fired from any NATO 8 in (203 mm) howitzer e.g. the M115 and M110 howitzer. The weapon was produced in two models; the enhanced radiation (ERW) W79 Mod 0 and fission-only W79 Mod 1. Both were plutonium-based linear-implosion nuclear weapons.

- The Mod 0 was a variable yield device with three yields, ranging from 100 tons of TNT (420 GJ) up to 1.1 kt (4.6 TJ) and an enhanced-radiation mode which could be turned on or off
- The Mod 1 was fission-only with a fixed 0.8 kt (3.3 TJ) yield, corresponding with the maximum fission only yield of the Mod 0

Both models were 8 in (203 mm) in diameter, 44 in (1,100 mm) long and weighed 200 lb (91 kg). The W79 was developed by Lawrence Livermore National Laboratory, starting in 1975. Production of the different mods took place from July 1981 through August 1986. A total of 550 warheads (325 Mod 0s, 225 Mod 1s) were produced. All units were retired from active service by the end of 1992 with the last shell dismantled at the Pantex Plant in Texas in August 2002.

== History ==
The weapon received Phase 3 authorisation in January 1975 and cleared a critical budget review before the Joint Committee on Atomic Energy in April 1975.

First production unit was in July 1981. Quantity production on the standard (non-ERW) W79-1 version of the weapon began in September 1981 and continued until the summer of 1984. Production of the ERW W79-0 version began in 1984 and continued until August 1986.

During development, an unnamed part of the weapon was deemed too impractical to manufacture and a significant design revision was undertaken. This design changed the physics behaviour of the weapon and a new nuclear test was required to certify the new design.

In early 1988, a new 3-dimensional computer simulation suggested that the weapon was not one-point safe under certain conditions. Nuclear testing carried out in December 1988 and February 1989 confirmed these findings.

== Design ==
The weapon had a range of 24 kilometres (15 mi) or 30 kilometres (19 mi) with rocket assist.

The weapon utilized the M735 proximity fuze. It contained a dual-channel fuze system, target sensor, electronic programmer and power supply. Its design goals were to minimize overall weight, minimize structural volume, eliminate the use of potting materials for structural support, and to eliminate cable and wire harnesses. The goal of not using potting materials was ultimately not met.

The fuze was developed with an extensive test firing program and in service use would have experienced a 10,400 g_{0} (102,000 m/s^{2}) setback acceleration and 11,400 revolutions per minute (190 Hz) spin. Some test units experienced setbacks of 15,300 g_{0} (150,000 m/s^{2}).

During early development, the intermediate cost Nonviolent Explosive Destruct System (NEDS) was selected to secure the weapon against unauthorised use. This system was tested at Tonopah Test Range.

== Gallery ==
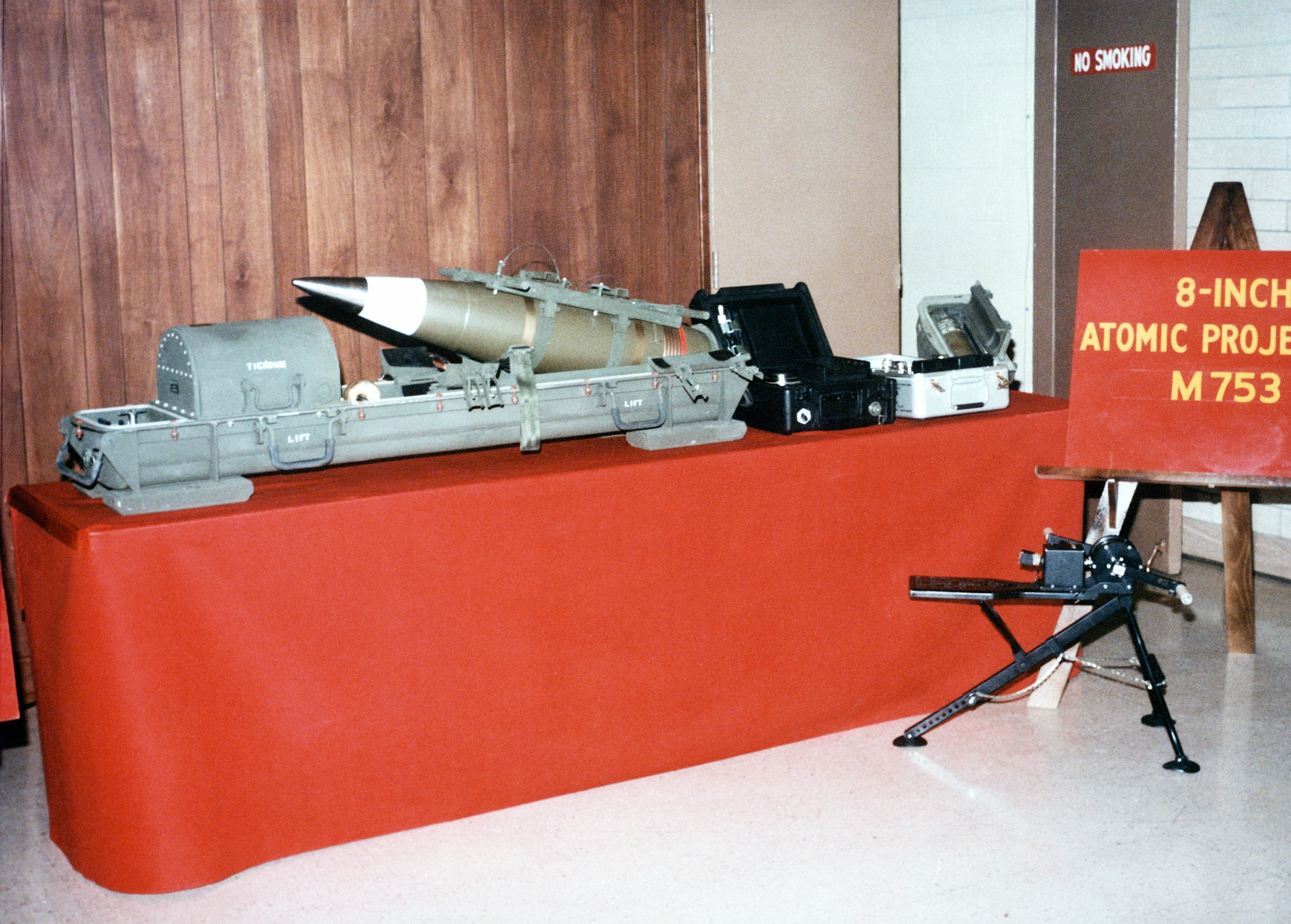
W79 AFAP on display.

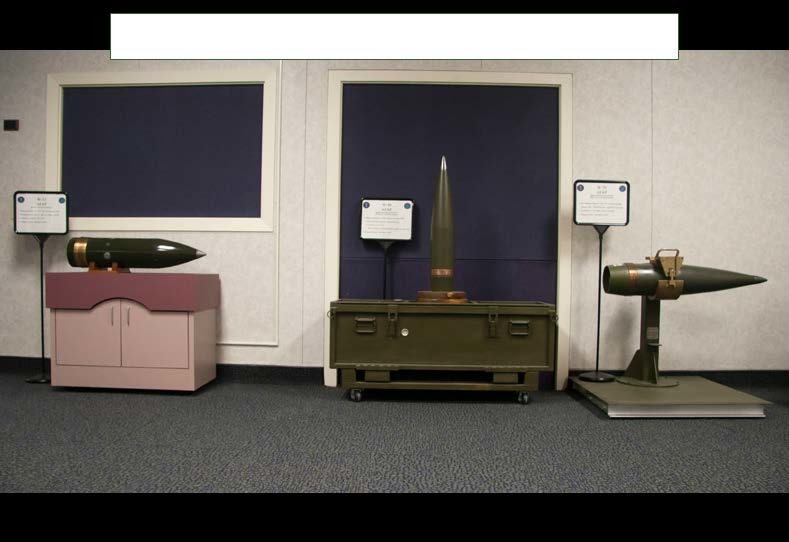
W79 AFAP on display (right).

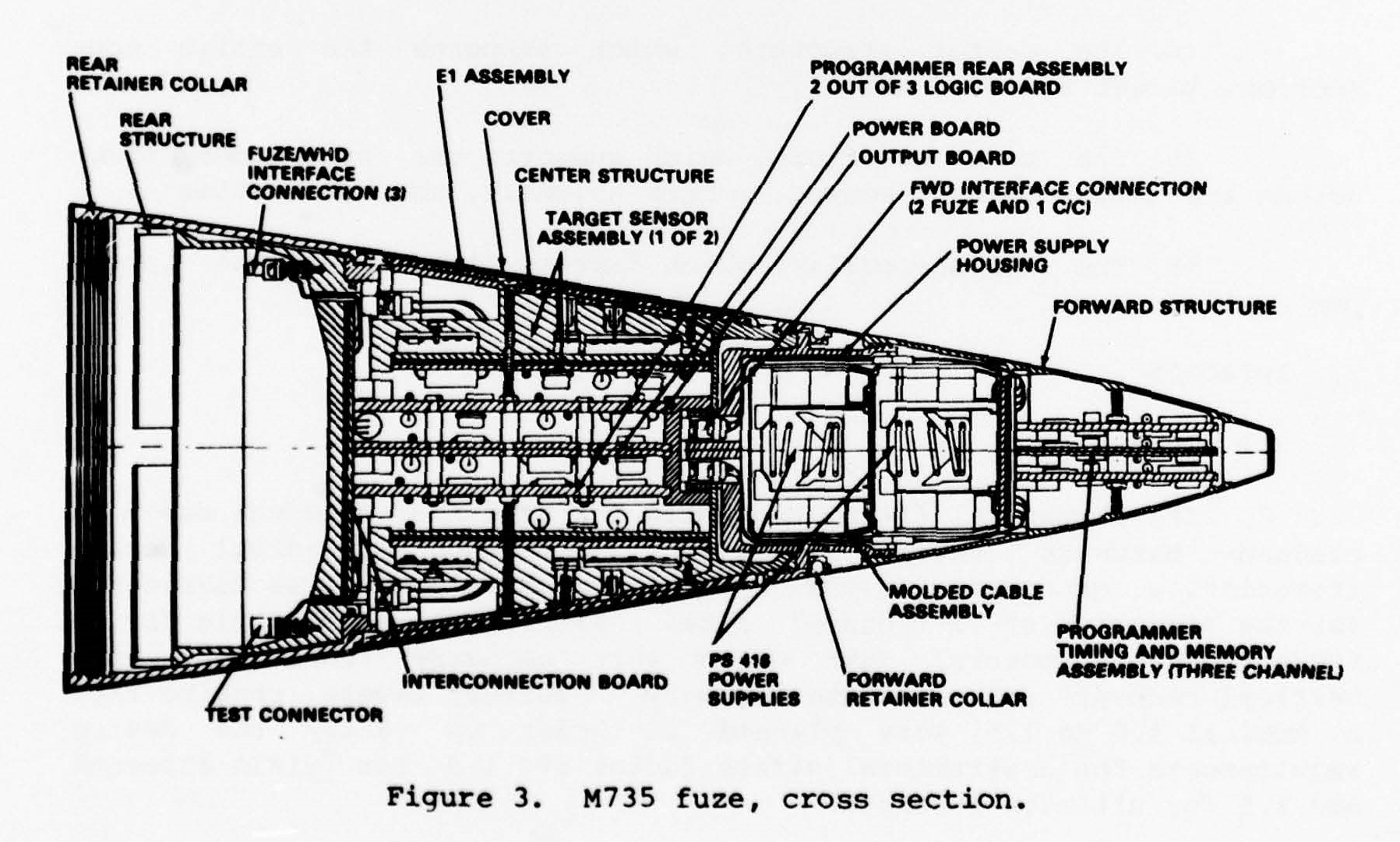
Diagram of the M735 fuze.

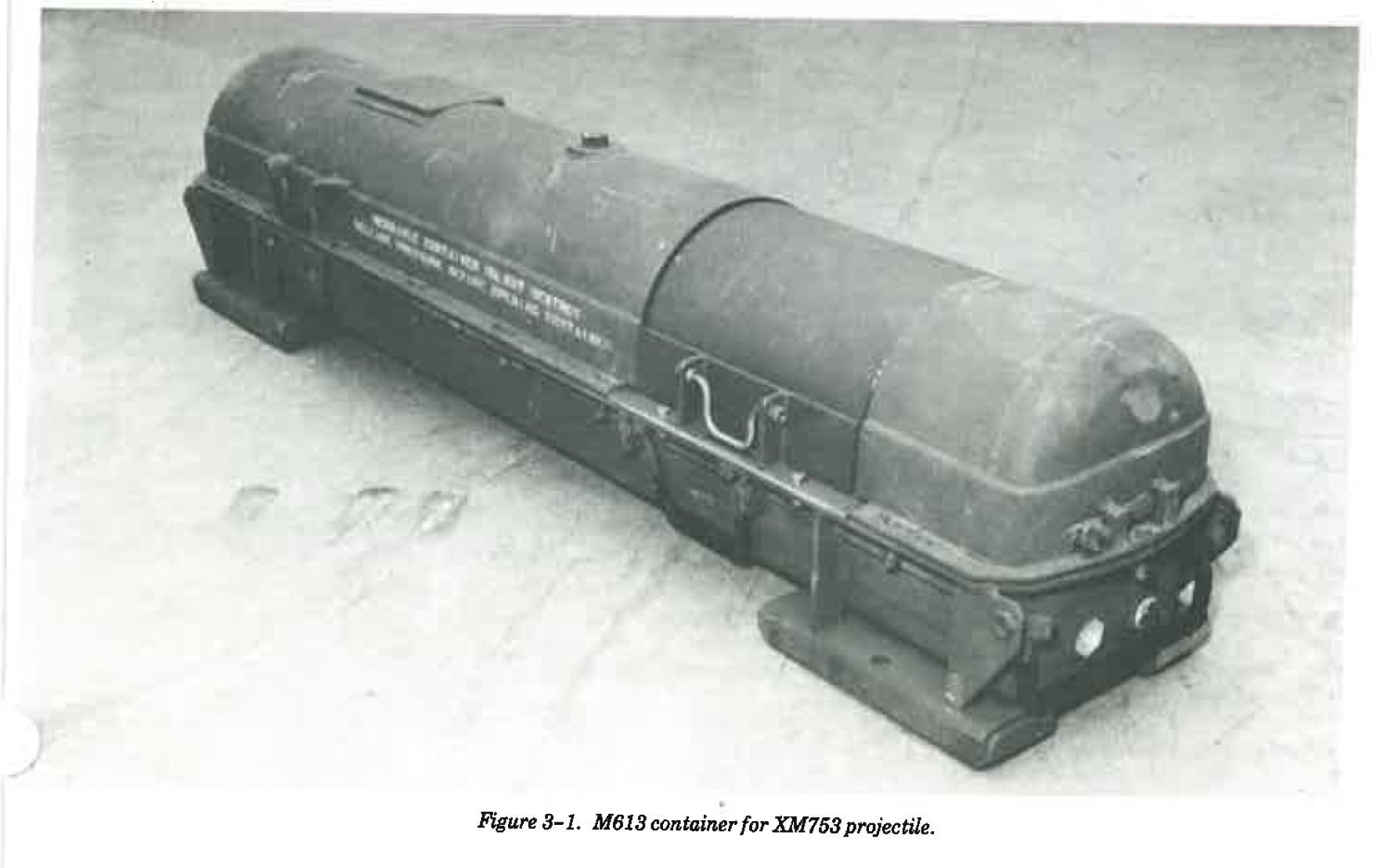
W79 (XM753) nuclear artillery projectile in its storage container

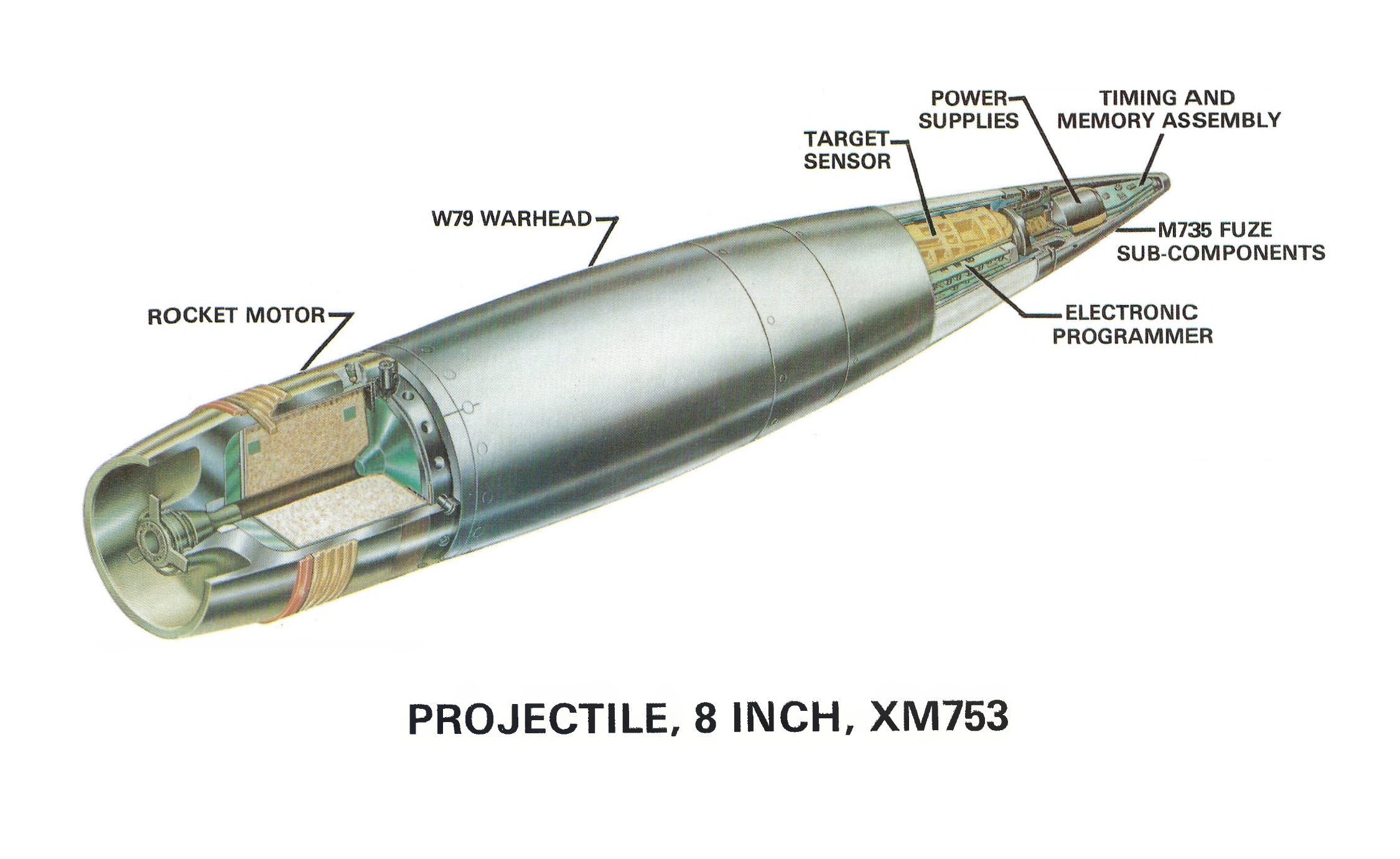
Drawing of the W79 (XM753) projectile.

== See also ==
- Neutron bomb
- Nuclear weapon design
- List of nuclear weapons
