= Sprint (missile) =

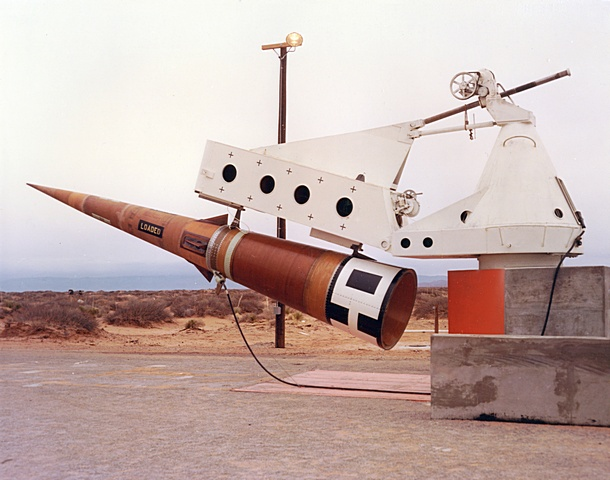
- Sprint anti-ballistic missile interceptor on a test stand.
- Type: Anti-ballistic missile
- Place of origin: United States

Service history
- In service: 1975–76

Production history
- Manufacturer: Martin Marietta

Specifications
- Mass: 7,700 pounds (3,500 kg)
- Length: 26.9 feet (8.20 m)
- Diameter: 53 inches (1.35 m)
- Warhead: W66 nuclear low kt
- Engine: 1st stage: Hercules X-265 650,000 pounds-force (2,900 kN); 2nd Stage: Hercules X-271
- Propellant: Solid fuel
- Operational range: 25 miles (40 km)
- Flight ceiling: 19 miles (30 km)
- Maximum speed: 7,610 miles per hour; 12,300 kilometers per hour; 3,400 meters per second (Mach 10)
- Guidance system: Radio command guidance
- Launch platform: Silo

The Sprint was a two-stage, solid-fuel anti-ballistic missile (ABM), armed with a W66 enhanced-radiation thermonuclear warhead used by the United States Army during 1975–76. It was designed to intercept incoming reentry vehicles (RV) after they had descended below an altitude of about 60 kilometres (37 mi), where the thickening air stripped away any decoys or radar reflectors and exposed the RV to observation by radar. As the RV would be traveling at about 5 miles per second (8,047 m/s; 26,400 ft/s; Mach 24), Sprint needed to have phenomenal performance to achieve an interception in the few seconds before the RV reached its target.

Sprint accelerated at 100 g, reaching a speed of Mach 10 (12,000 km/h; 7,600 mph) in 5 seconds. Such a high velocity at relatively low altitudes created skin temperatures up to 6,200 °F (3,400 °C), requiring an ablative shield to dissipate the heat. The high temperature caused a plasma to form around the missile, requiring extremely powerful radio signals to reach it for guidance. The missile glowed bright white as it flew.

Sprint was the centerpiece of the Nike-X system which concentrated on placing bases around large cities to intercept Soviet warheads. The cost of such a system quickly became untenable as the Soviets added more ICBMs to their fleet, and Nike-X was abandoned. In its place came the Sentinel program, which used Sprint as a last-ditch defense against RVs that evaded the much longer-ranged LIM-49 Spartan. Sentinel was changed to become the Safeguard Program, which was operational only for a few months from October 1975 to early 1976. Congressional opposition and high costs linked to its questionable economics and efficacy against the emerging MIRV warheads of the Soviet Union resulted in a very short operational period.

During the early 1970s, some work was carried out on an improved Sprint II, which was mostly concerned with the guidance systems. These were to be dedicated to the task of protecting the Minuteman missile fields. Further work was canceled as US ABM policy changed.

== History ==
=== Nike Zeus ===
The US Army had considered the issue of shooting down theater ballistic missiles of the V-2 missile type as early as the mid-1940s. Early studies suggested their short flight times, on the order of 5 minutes, would make it difficult to detect, track, and shoot at these weapons. In theory it would be easier to attack intercontinental ballistic missiles (ICBM) with their longer flight times and higher trajectories.

In 1955 the Army gave Bell Labs, who had developed the earlier Nike missiles, a contract to study the ABM issue. They returned a report stating the concept was within the state of the art and could be built using modest upgrades to the latest Army surface-to-air missile, the Nike Hercules. The main technological issues would be the need for extremely powerful radars that could detect the incoming ICBM warheads long enough in advance to fire on them and computers with enough speed to develop tracks for the targets in engagements that lasted seconds.

Bell began development of what became Nike Zeus in 1956, working out of the Nike development center at Redstone Arsenal. The program went fairly smoothly, and the first tests were carried out in the summer of 1959. By 1962, a complete Zeus base had been built on Kwajalein Atoll and proved very successful over the following year, successfully intercepting test warheads and even low-flying satellites.

=== New concept ===
During the period Zeus was being developed, several problems arose that appeared to make it trivially easy to defeat. The simplest was that its 1950s-era mechanical radars could track a limited number of targets, and it could be easily overwhelmed by numbers; a report by the Gaither Committee suggested a salvo of four warheads would have a 90% chance of destroying a Zeus base. This was of little concern during early development when ICBMs were enormously expensive, but as their cost fell and the Soviets claimed to be turning them out "like sausages", this became a serious problem.

However, other issues also became obvious in the late 1950s. One issue was that nuclear explosions in space had been tested in 1958 and found that they blanketed a huge area with radiation that blocked radar signals above about 60 kilometers (37 mi) altitude. By exploding a single warhead above the Zeus sites, the Soviets could block observation of following warheads until they were too close to attack. Another simple measure would be to pack radar reflectors in with the warhead, presenting many false targets on the radar screens that cluttered the displays.

As the problems piled up, Secretary of Defense Neil H. McElroy asked ARPA to study the anti-missile concept. ARPA noted that both the radar decoys and high-altitude explosions stopped working in the thickening lower atmosphere. Once the warhead descended below about 60 km, it could be picked up on radar again. However, as the warhead would be moving at about 5 miles per second (8 km/s; Mach 24), it would be only seconds from its target. An extremely high-speed missile would be needed to attack them during this period.

=== Sprint ===
The result of the ARPA study came at the height of the debate over the Zeus system in the early 1960s. Secretary of Defense Robert McNamara convinced President John F. Kennedy that Zeus was simply not worth deploying. He suggested using the funds allocated to its deployment to develop the ARPA system, which became known as Nike-X, a name given by engineering professor Jack Ruina when he was reporting on the concept. Nike-X required great improvements in radars, computers, and especially the missile. Zeus had an attack profile lasting about a minute; Nike-X's interceptions would last about five seconds.

=== Sprint II ===
Work on initial investigations into "Follow-On Sprint" was underway in the second quarter of 1968. Los Alamos National Laboratory was examining two warheads for the Upstage II design variation. By third-quarter 1971, Sprint II was incorporated into a module for Safeguard called Hardsite Defense (HSD) and a joint Atomic Energy Commission/Department of Defense working group was examining warheads that would require less tritium. HSD was described as:

... [consisting] of an autonomous module for close-in, low-altitude intercept (≈10,000 to 30,000 ft) and is based upon three radar/data-processor units located about 10 nautical miles apart. The module will have six or seven firing sites containing about 100 modified Sprint interceptors to defend approximately 21 silos.

By the first quarter of 1972, the system was renamed Site Defense, and its purpose was to defend Minuteman silos. Over the original Sprint missile, the Sprint II interceptor had slightly reduced launch dispersion, increased hardness to the effect of nuclear weapons, and decreased miss distance. Los Alamos staff expected a request for warhead development sometime in FY-1972-1974. A Phase 2 feasibility study report was completed by Los Alamos in third-quarter 1972, and investigations into warhead design continued into first-quarter 1973. It is unclear when Sprint II was canceled; however, a report on Sprint II electrical connectors was published in April 1977.

== Design ==
The conical Sprint was stored in and launched from a silo. To make the launch as quick as possible, the missile, which was ejected by an explosive-driven piston, simply blasted through the fiberglass silo cover. As the missile cleared the silo at 0.6 seconds, the first stage fired and the missile was tilted toward its target. The first stage was exhausted after only 1.2 seconds but produced 650,000 pounds-force (2,900 kilonewtons) of thrust. On separation, the spent first stage disintegrated due to aerodynamic forces. The second stage fired within 1 to 2 seconds of launch. Interception at an altitude of 1 to 19 miles (1.5 to 30 km) took at most 15 seconds.

The first stage's Hercules X-265 engine is believed to have contained alternating layers of zirconium "staples" embedded in nitrocellulose powder, followed by gelatinizing with nitroglycerine, thus forming a higher thrust double-base powder. The Sprint was controlled by ground-based radio command guidance, which tracked the incoming reentry vehicles with phased array radar and guided the missile to its target. The Sprint was armed with an enhanced radiation nuclear warhead with a yield reportedly of a few kilotons, though the number has not been declassified. The warhead was intended to destroy the incoming reentry vehicle primarily by neutron flux.

The first test of the Sprint missile took place at White Sands Missile Range on 17 November 1965.

The Sprint missile never received an official designation under the 1963 United States Tri-Service rocket and guided missile designation system. Some sources suggest the designations XLIM-99 or XLIM-100, which were never officially assigned, but have been reserved in 1972 for a unidentified experimental silo-launched interceptor missile. However, the evidence for those is limited and mostly anecdotal.

== Design predecessors ==
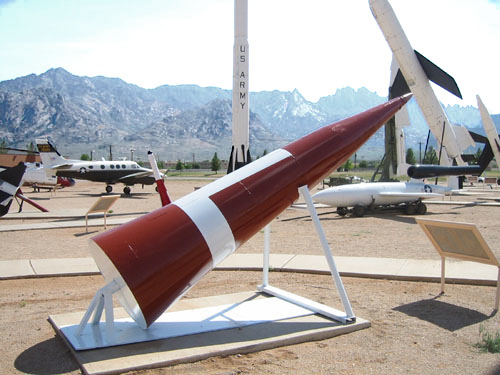
White Sands Missile Range Museum HIBEX rocket display

The "HIBEX" (high boost experiment) missile is considered to be somewhat of a design predecessor and competitor to the Sprint missile, as it was a similar high-acceleration missile in the early 1960s, with a technological transfer from that program to the Sprint development program occurring. Both were tested at the White Sands Launch Complex 38. Although HIBEX's initial acceleration rate was higher, at near 400 g, its role was to intercept reentry vehicles at a much lower altitude than Sprint, 20,000 feet (6,100 m), and it is considered to be a last-ditch anti-ballistic missile "in a similar vein to Sprint". HIBEX employed a star-grain "composite modified double-base propellant", known as FDN-80, created from the mixing of ammonium perchlorate, aluminum, and double-base smokeless powder, with zirconium staples (0.125 inches (3 mm) in length) embedded or "randomly dispersed" throughout the matrix.

== Survivors ==
- The Air Defense Artillery museum at Fort Sill, Oklahoma has both Safeguard missiles (Sprint and Spartan), plus Nike Zeus and HIBEX on exhibit.
- The White Sands Missile Range Museum has a HIBEX on exhibit.
- Remote Site Launch Sprint Missile Historic Museum, RSL #3 missile site, Cavalier, North Dakota (full scale replica on display)

== Gallery ==
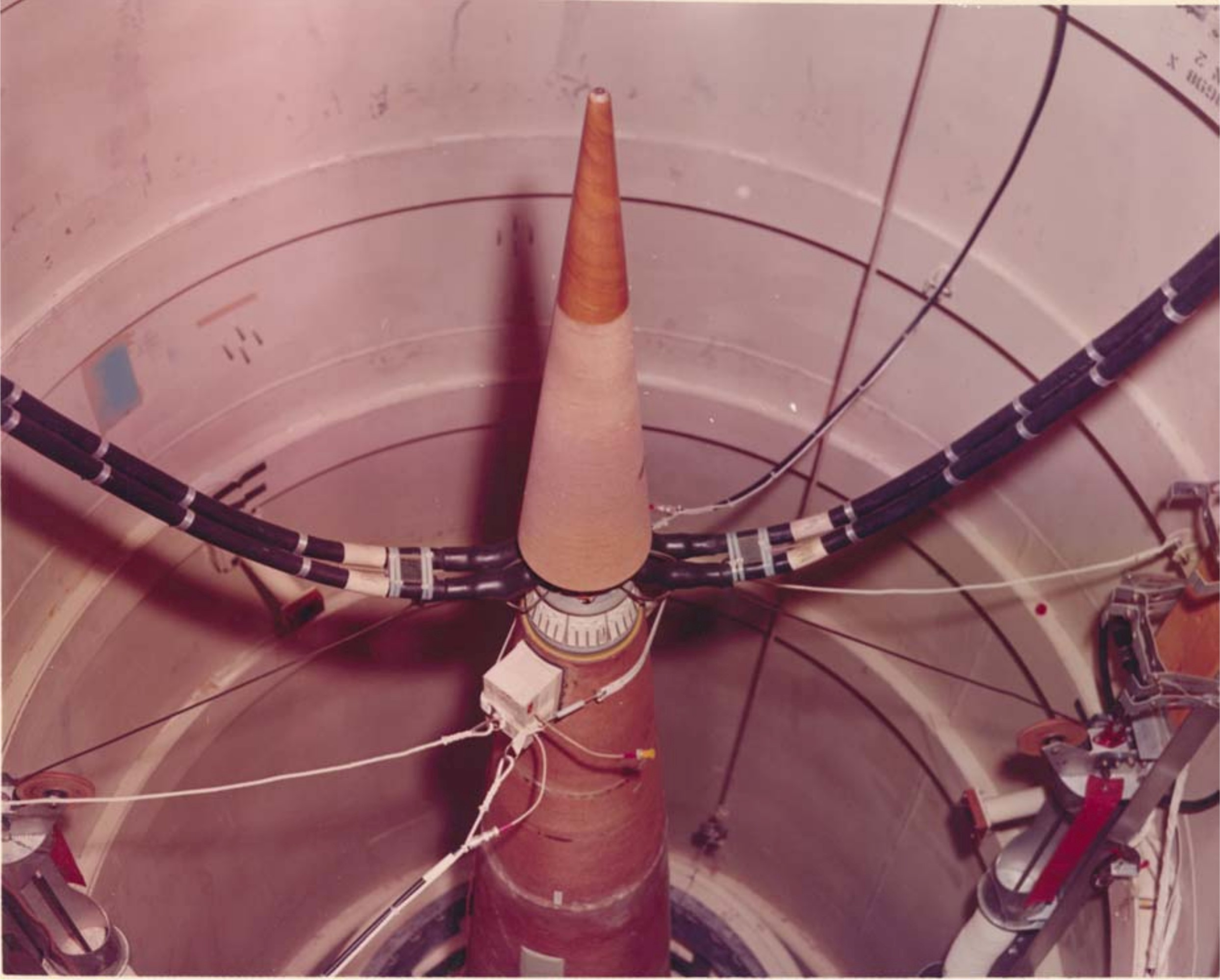
Closeup of Sprint anti-ballistic missile nosecone in its silo. The nose would deflect slightly to steer the missile in flight.

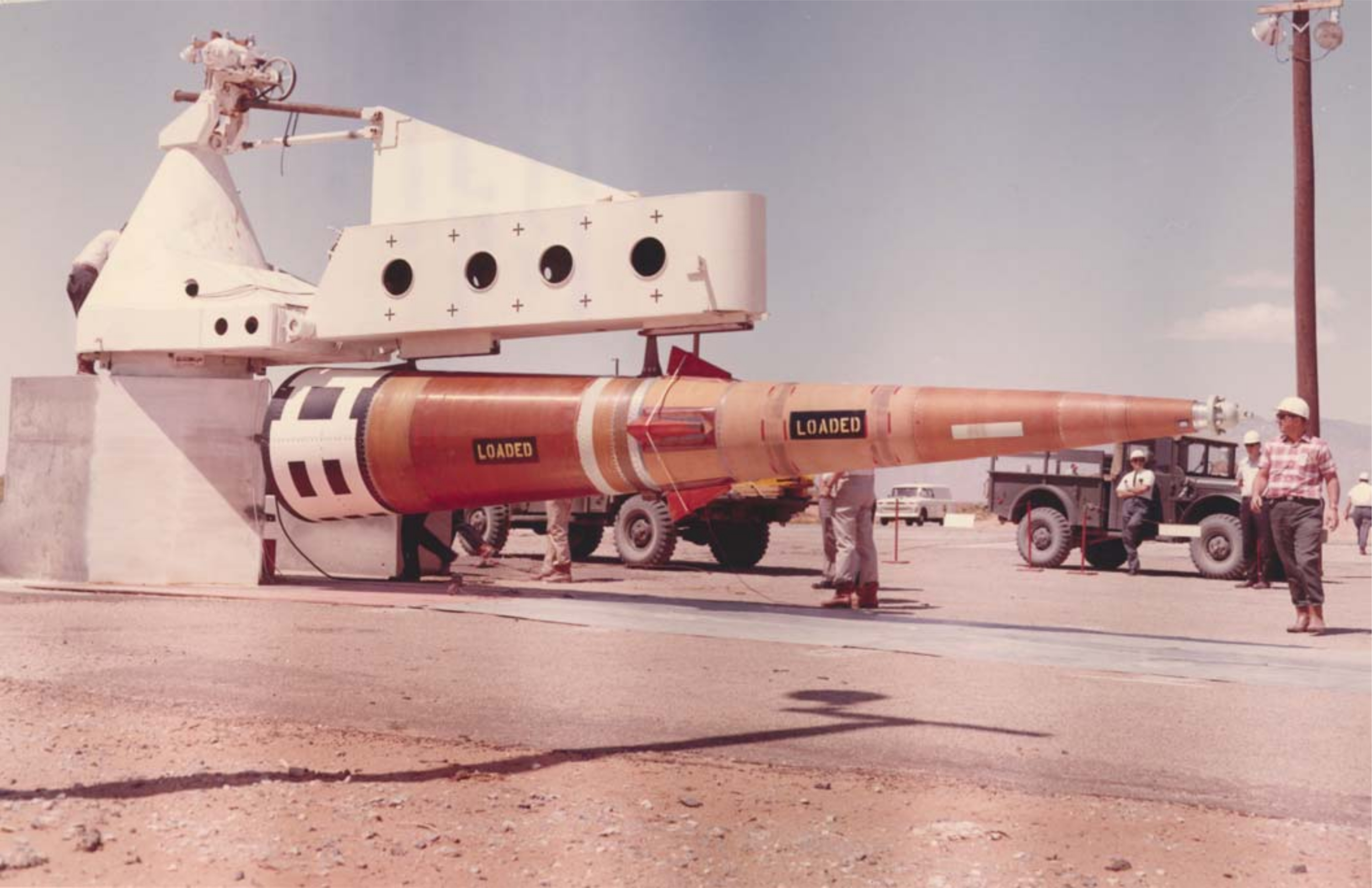
Sprint anti-ballistic missile on a test stand before launch.

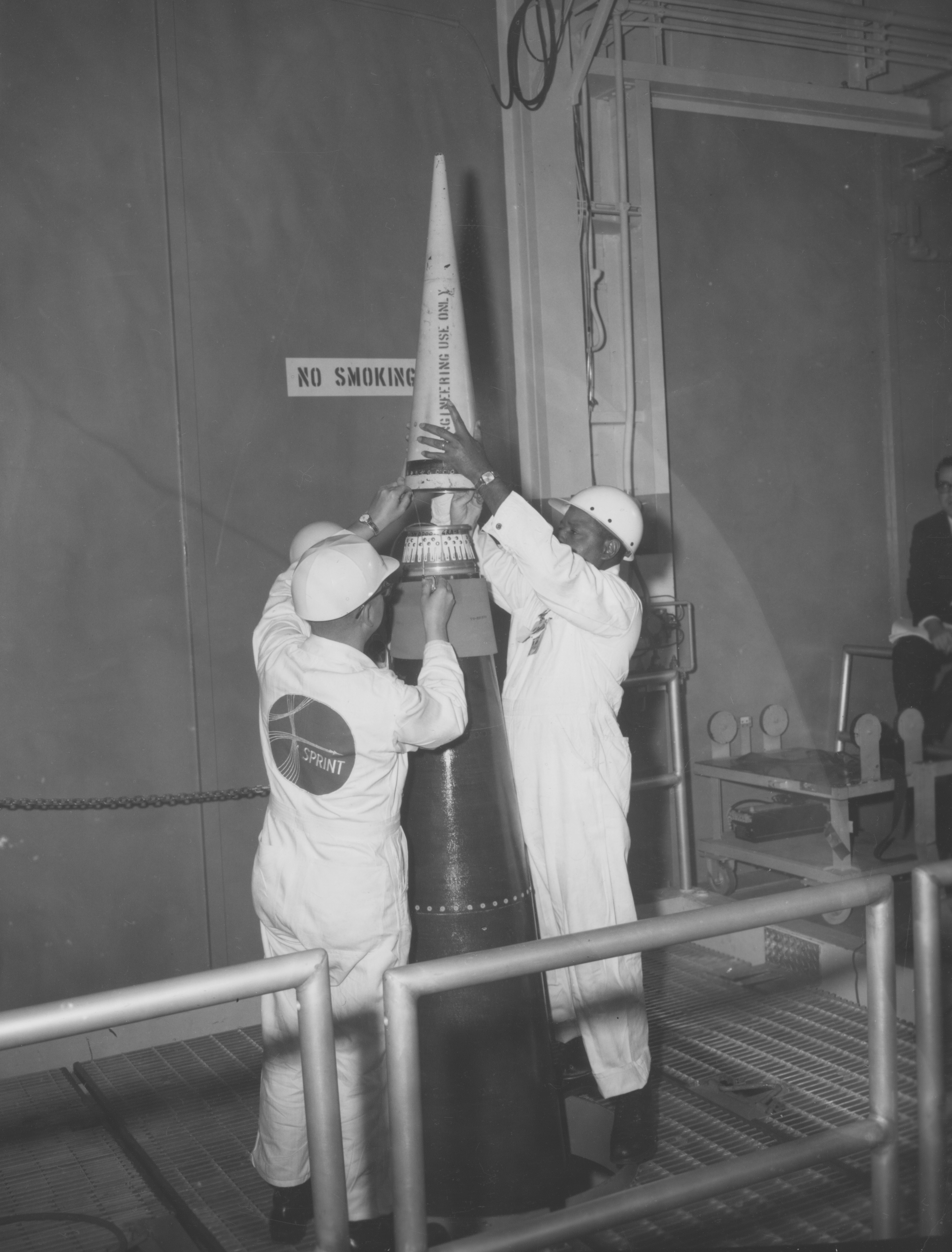
Final assembly of a Sprint missile before a test.

== See also ==
- 53T6 – USSR anti-ballistic missile
- Comparison of anti-ballistic missile systems – Defense system comparison
