= W63 (nuclear warhead) =

The W63 was the Lawrence Livermore Laboratory's entry into a brief competition between Livermore and Los Alamos to design a warhead for the Army's Lance tactical surface to surface missile.

In July 1964 both Livermore Labs and Los Alamos started developing competing warheads for the Lance. The Los Alamos design, the W64, was canceled in September 1964 in favor of Livermore's W63. In November 1966 W63 was canceled in favor of the W70.
