= W66 (nuclear warhead) =

Thermonuclear warhead

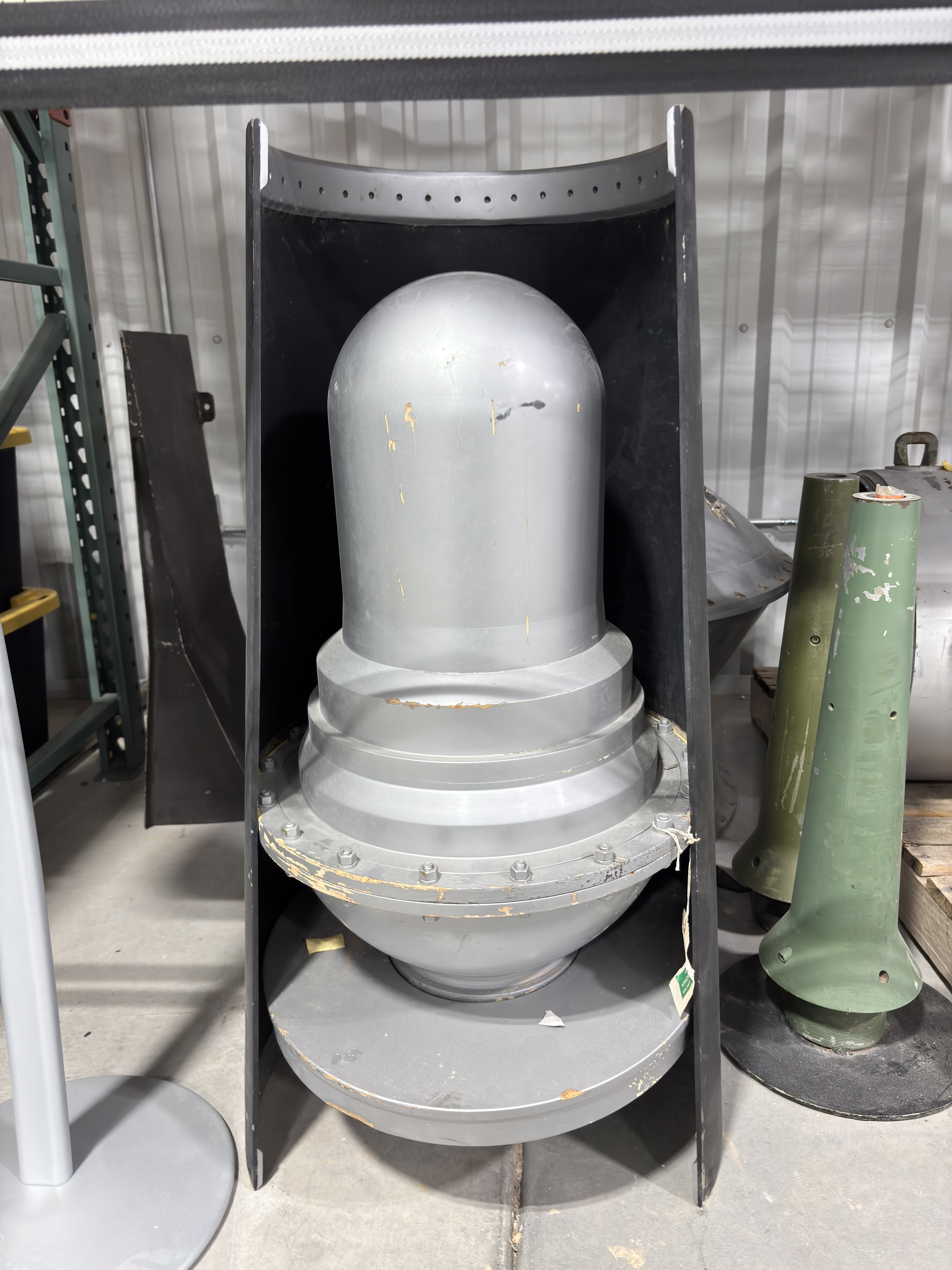
A mockup of the W66 nuclear warhead fitted inside a Sprint warhead section on display in the National Museum of Nuclear Science and History.

The W66 was a thermonuclear warhead carried by the Sprint anti-ballistic missile system, designed to be a short-range interceptor to shoot down incoming ICBM warheads.

The W66 had a yield of 2 kilotonnes of TNT (8.4 TJ) and was an enhanced radiation ("neutron") weapon. The W66 was 18 inches (46 cm) in diameter and 35 inches (89 cm) long, with a weight of approximately 150 pounds (68 kg). The weapon was a two-stage design.

The W66 was based on the Arrow warhead design and by December 1966 had undergone six nuclear tests.

== See also ==
- List of nuclear weapons
- LIM-49A Spartan
- Safeguard Program
