= W70 =

U.S. tactical nuclear warhead

W70 nuclear warhead
- Type: Nuclear weapon
- Place of origin: United States

Production history
- Designer: Lawrence Livermore National Laboratory
- Produced: W71-1,-2 June 1973 to July 1977; W70-3 August 1981 to February 1983
- No. built: W70-1,-2 900 produced W70-3 380 produced.
- Variants: 3

Specifications
- Mass: 270 lb (120 kg)
- Length: 41 inches (100 cm)
- Diameter: 18 in (46 cm)
- Blast yield: W70-1,-2 0.5 to 50 kilotonnes of TNT (2.1 to 209.2 TJ); W70-3 1 kilotonne of TNT (4.2 TJ)

W70 was a two-stage, thermonuclear warhead that was developed for the MGM-52 Lance missile by the United States. Designed by Lawrence Livermore National Laboratory, the Mod 1 and Mod 2 version of the weapon entered service in 1973, while the enhanced radiation ("neutron bomb") Mod 3 weapon entered service in 1981. The last W70 warhead was dismantled in February 1996.

== Design ==
Declassified British documents describe the Mod 1 and Mod 2 versions of the weapon as having three yields between 0.5 and 50 kilotonnes of TNT (2.1 and 209.2 TJ), while the Mod 3 enhanced radiation version was estimated to have a yield of 1 kilotonne of TNT (4.2 TJ) The Mod 1 reportedly had more yield options than the Mod 2 warheads. The Mod 3 was reportedly 40% fission and 60% fusion, with two yield options. The weapon weighed 270 lb (120 kg), and was 41 inches (100 cm) long and 18 in (46 cm) in diameter.

Mod 1 and 2 weapons were produced from June 1973 to July 1977, while Mod 3 weapons were produced from August 1981 to February 1983. 900 Mod 1 and 2 warheads and 380 Mod 3 warheads were manufactured. The last warheads were retired in September 1992.

The weapon was the successor to the previous proposed Lance warhead, the W63. The weapon used a category D Permissive Action Link and had command disable, but lacked insensitive high explosives and enhanced nuclear detonation safety.

The inventor of the neutron bomb, Samuel Cohen, has criticized the description of the W70 as a "neutron bomb":

the W-70 ... is not even remotely a "neutron bomb." Instead of being the type of weapon that, in the popular mind, "kills people and spares buildings" it is one that both kills and physically destroys on a massive scale. The W-70 is not a discriminate weapon, like the neutron bomb—which, incidentally, should be considered a weapon that "kills enemy personnel while sparing the physical fabric of the attacked populace, and even the populace too."

== See also ==
- MGM-52 Lance
- List of nuclear weapons

== Bibliography ==
- Sandia Weapon Review: Nuclear Weapon Characteristics Handbook (PDF) (Report). Sandia National Labs. September 1990. SAND90-1238. Archived (PDF) from the original on 2022-01-12.
