= MGM-52 Lance =

1970s short-range ballistic missile of American origin

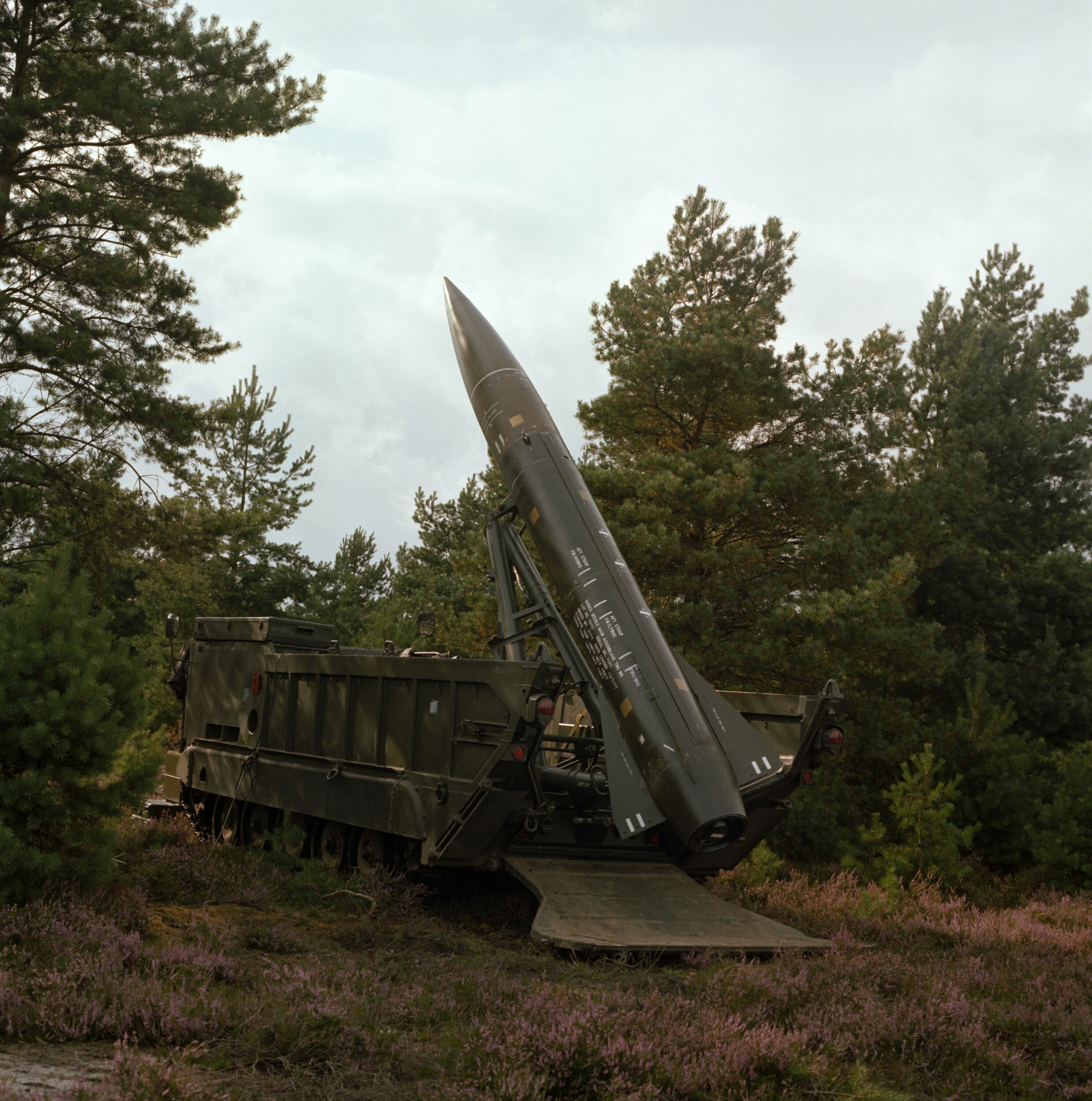
- MGM-52C Lance missile erected for launch from the tracked M752 self-propelled launcher.
- Type: Tactical ballistic missile
- Place of origin: United States

Service history
- In service: 1972–1992
- Used by: United States, United Kingdom, Belgium, Netherlands, Italy, and West Germany

Production history
- Manufacturer: LTV; Lockheed Martin Missiles and Fire Control
- Unit cost: ~US$800K (1996 dollars); ~US$1.5 million (2024)
- No. built: 2,133

Specifications
- Mass: 2,850–3,367 lb (1,293–1,527 kg) depending on warhead
- Length: 21 ft (6.4 m)
- Diameter: 22 in (560 mm)
- Warhead: 1 W70 nuclear or M251 high explosive submunitions
- Blast yield: 1–100 kilotons of TNT (4.2–418.4 TJ)
- Engine: Liquid-propellant rocket
- Operational range: 45–80 mi (72–129 km), depending on warhead
- Maximum speed: >Mach 3
- Guidance system: inertial guidance
- Accuracy: 150 m CEP

The MGM-52 Lance was a mobile field artillery tactical surface-to-surface missile (tactical ballistic missile) system used to provide both nuclear and conventional fire support to the United States Army. The missile's warhead was developed at Lawrence Livermore National Laboratory. It was replaced by MGM-140 ATACMS, which was initially intended to likewise have a nuclear capability during the Cold War.

== History ==
The first Lance missiles were deployed in 1972, replacing (together with the US-Navy's nuclear-tipped RIM-2D and RIM-8E/B/D) the earlier Honest John rocket and Sergeant SRBM ballistic missile, greatly reducing the weight and bulk of the system, while improving both accuracy and mobility. They were deployed extensively in Europe after 1972. In 1990, it was reported that 90 launchers were deployed in western Europe, with 300 conventional high explosive warheads and 700 nuclear warheads available. 150 nuclear warheads were reportedly in the United States, bringing the total available nuclear warheads to at least 850, which are all now believed to have been destroyed by the US.

The Lance missile was progressively removed from service from 1991 to 1994 and was partially replaced in the conventional role by the MGM-140 ATACMS. Some surplus missiles were used as intercept targets by MIM-23 Hawk and MIM-104 Patriot systems. An upgrade for the Lance was planned and named Follow-on-to-Lance (FOTL). Army planners envisioned a new missile with a range of 250 to 270 miles, considerably longer than the range of the Lance missile, but within the limits for short-range missiles allowed under the INF Treaty. However, in the context of nuclear disarmament the NATO summit in May 1990 decided not to go forward with modernization to the FOTL standard.

The Bundeswehr Museum of German Defense Technology in Koblenz has one of these rockets in its collection.

== Design ==
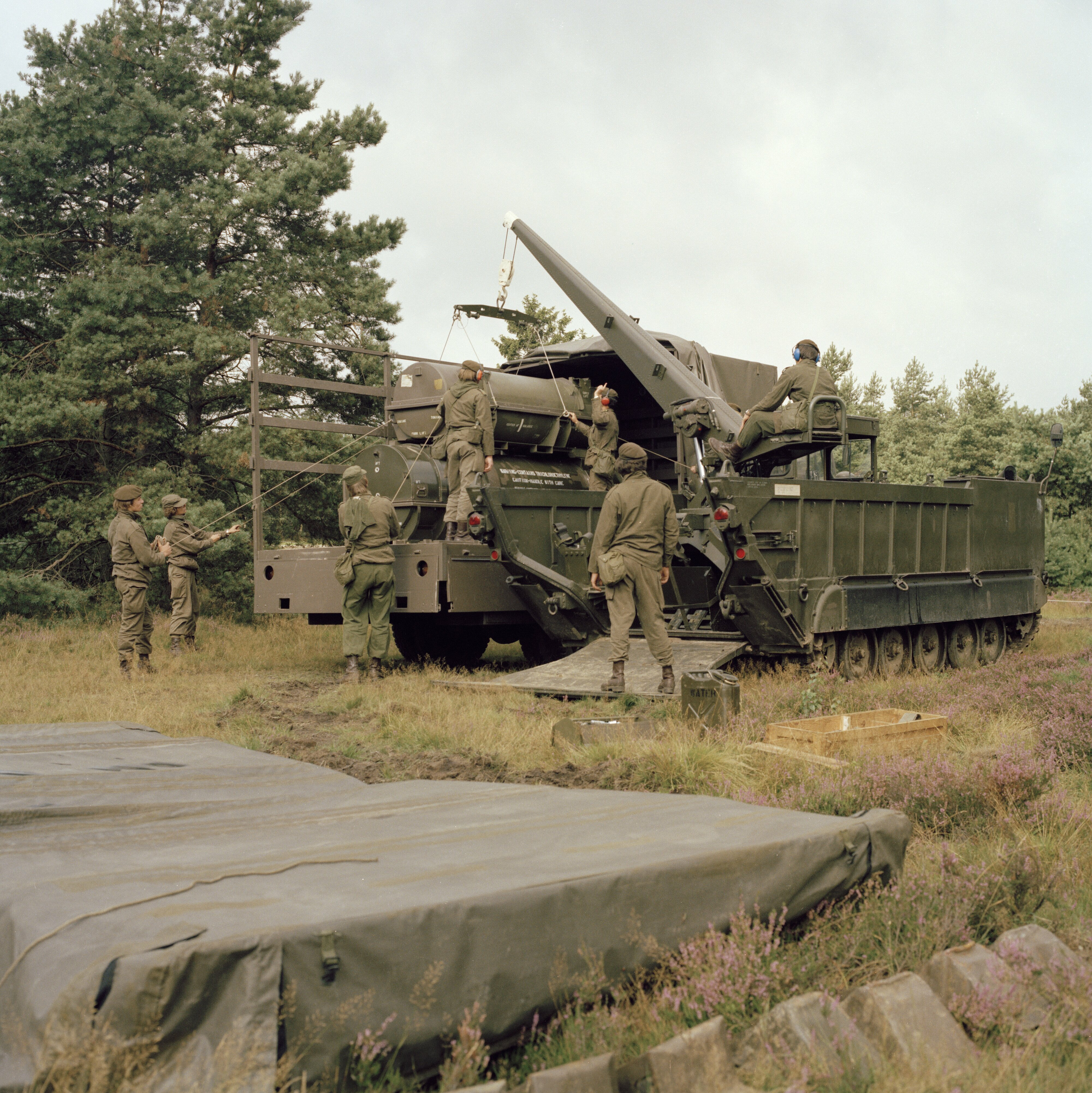
M688 tracked transporter/loader vehicle (shares the same chassis as the M752) transferring missiles from a utility truck.

=== Payload ===
The payload consisted either of a W70 nuclear warhead with a yield of 1–100 kt (4.2–418.4 TJ) or a variety of conventional munitions. The W70-3 nuclear warhead version was one of the first warheads to be battlefield-ready with an "enhanced radiation" (neutron bomb) capability. The W70-3 warhead became available after 1982, and only to US forces. Conventional munitions included single conventional shaped-charge warhead for penetrating hard targets and for bunker busting or a cluster configuration containing 836 M74 bomblets for anti-personnel and anti-materiel uses. The original design considered a chemical weapon warhead option, but this development was cancelled in 1970.

=== Guidance, navigation, and control ===
Lance missiles were equipped with simple inertial navigation systems, which use sensors to track the movement of the missile and compare it to a known starting point to guide the missile to the target. The missile is spin stabilized in flight to improve accuracy, achieving a circular error probable of 492 ft (150 m).

=== Propulsion ===
The Lance used stable liquid propellants. The missile's engine had an unusual arrangement, with a small sustainer engine mounted within a toroidal boost engine. They were capable of speed greater than Mach 3 and had a range of up to 80 mi (129 km).

=== Launch platform and support equipment ===
A Lance battery (two fire units) consisted of two M752 launchers (one missile each) and two M688 auxiliary vehicles (two missiles each), for a total six missiles; the firing rate per unit was approximately three missiles per hour. The launch vehicles were also able to carry and launch the MGR-1 Honest John with a special kit for operational war-zone mission-dependent flexibility (proposed additional kit).

== Operators ==
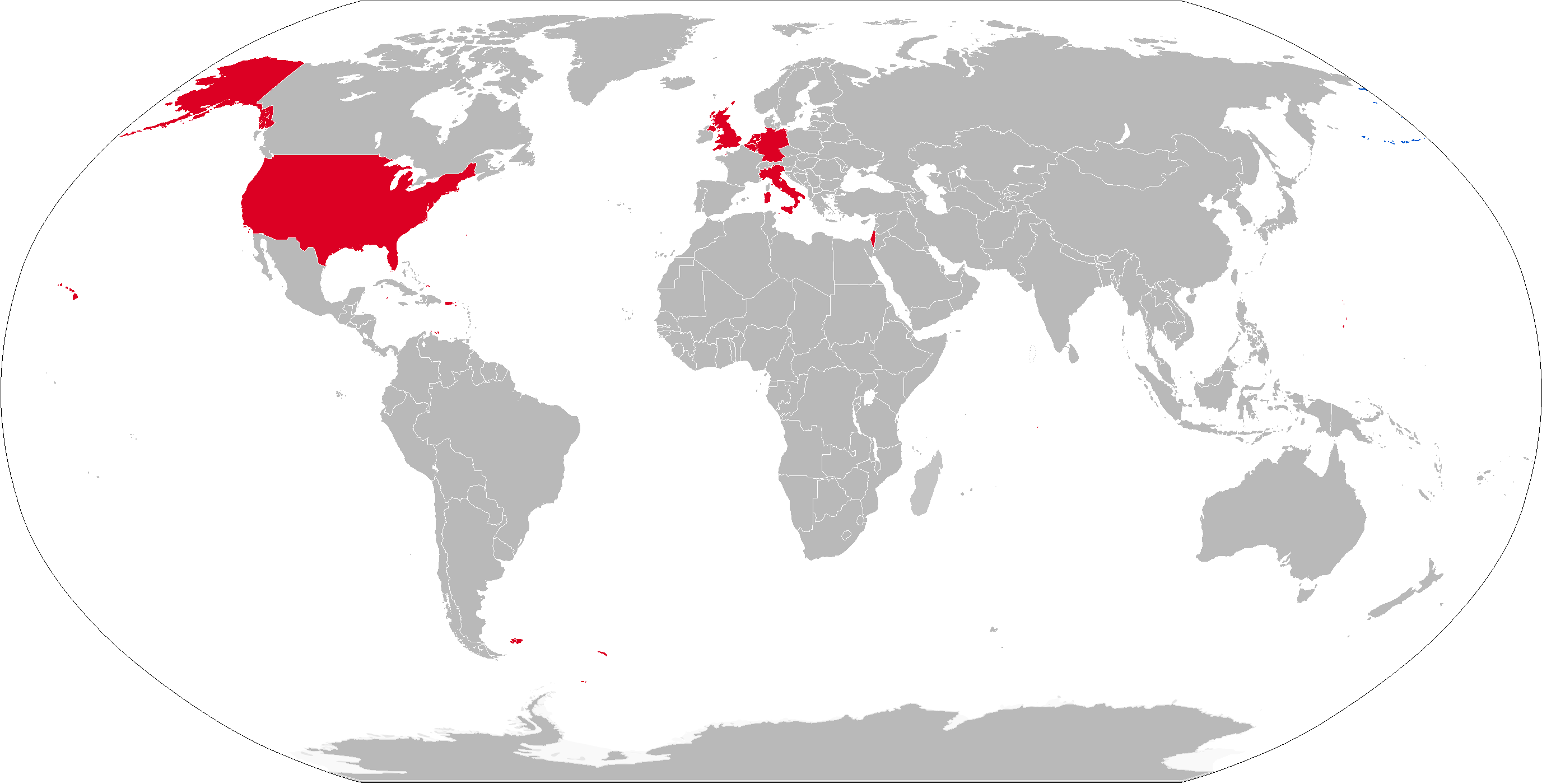
Map with former MGM-52 operators in red

=== Former operators ===
United States United States Army

- 1st Battalion, 12th Field Artillery Regiment (1973–1992) Fort Sill, Oklahoma
- 1st Battalion, 32nd Field Artillery Regiment (1975–1991) Hanau, Germany
- 6th Battalion, 33rd Field Artillery Regiment (1975–1987); redesignated as 6th Battalion, 32nd Field Artillery Regiment (1987–1991) Fort Sill (One battery was forward deployed to South Korea)
- 2nd Battalion, 42nd Field Artillery Regiment (1974–1987); redesignated as 4th Battalion, 12th Field Artillery Regiment (1987–1991) Crailsheim, Germany
- 3rd Battalion, 79th Field Artillery Regiment (1974–1986); redesignated as 2nd Battalion, 32nd Field Artillery Regiment (1986–1991) Giessen, Germany
- 1st Battalion, 80th Field Artillery Regiment (1974–1987); redesignated as 3rd Battalion, 12th Field Artillery Regiment (1987–1991) Aschaffenburg, Germany
- 1st Battalion, 333rd Field Artillery Regiment (1973–1986); redesignated as 3rd Battalion, 32nd Field Artillery Regiment (1986–1992) Wiesbaden, Germany
- 2nd Battalion, 377th Field Artillery Regiment (1974–1987); redesignated as 2nd Battalion, 12th Field Artillery Regiment (1987–1992) Herzogenaurach, Germany

United Kingdom British Army

- 50 Missile Regiment Royal Artillery (disbanded and retired weapons in 1993)

Israel Israeli Defence Forces

Netherlands Royal Netherlands Army

- 129th Artillery Battalion (1979–1992)

Belgium Belgian Land Component

- 3rd Artillery Battalion (1977–1992)

Italy Italian Army

- 3rd Missile Brigade "Aquileia" (up to 1991, then from 1992 to 2001, 3rd Missile Rgt)

Germany German Army

- 150th Rocket Artillery Battalion
- 250th Rocket Artillery Battalion
- 350th Rocket Artillery Battalion
- 650th Rocket Artillery Battalion

== See also ==
- UUM-125 Sea Lance, a similarly named, but unrelated submarine-launched missile
- Pluton, a similar French nuclear-armed tactical ballistic missile launched from a transporter erector launcher
- List of missiles
- M-numbers
