= Caesium-137 =

Radioactive isotope of caesium

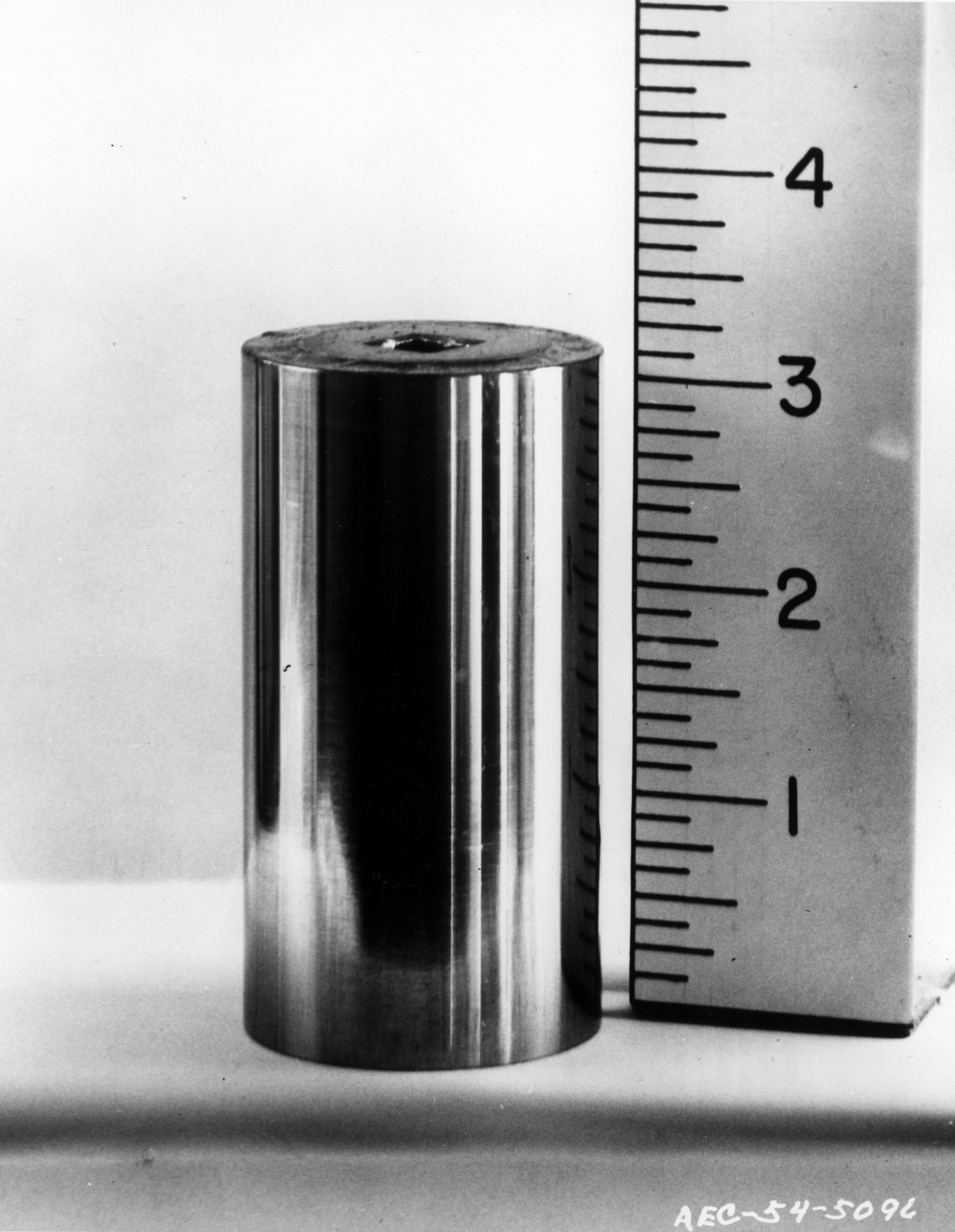
- A sealed caesium-137 radioactive source

General
- Symbol: ^{137}Cs
- Names: caesium-137
- Protons (Z): 55
- Neutrons (N): 82

Nuclide data
- Natural abundance: 0 (trace)
- Half-life (t_{1/2}): 30.04 years
- Isotope mass: 136.907 Da
- Spin: 7/2+
- Parent isotopes: ^{137}Xe (β^{−})
- Decay products: ^{137m}Ba^{137}Ba

Decay modes
- Decay mode: Decay energy (MeV)
- β- (beta decay): 0.5120
- γ (gamma-rays): 0.6617

Caesium-137 (^{137}_{55}Cs), cesium-137 (US), (Note: Caesium is the spelling recommended by the International Union of Pure and Applied Chemistry (IUPAC). International Union of Pure and Applied Chemistry (2005). Nomenclature of Inorganic Chemistry (IUPAC Recommendations 2005). Cambridge (UK): RSC–IUPAC. ISBN 0-85404-438-8. pp. 248–49. Electronic version..) or radiocaesium, is a radioactive isotope of caesium that is formed as one of the more common fission products by the nuclear fission of uranium-235 and other fissionable isotopes in nuclear reactors and nuclear weapons. Trace quantities also originate from spontaneous fission of uranium-238. It is among the most problematic of the short-to-medium-lifetime fission products. Caesium has a relatively low boiling point of 671 °C (1,240 °F) and easily becomes volatile when released suddenly at high temperature, as in the case of the Chernobyl nuclear accident and with nuclear explosions, and can travel very long distances in the air. After being deposited onto the soil as radioactive fallout, it moves and spreads easily in the environment because of the high water solubility of caesium's most common chemical compounds, which are salts. Caesium-137 was discovered by Glenn T. Seaborg and Margaret Melhase.

== Decay ==
^{137}Cs decay scheme showing half-lives, daughter nuclides, and types and proportion of radiation emitted.

^{137}Cs gamma spectrum. The characteristic 662 keV peak does not originate directly from ^{137}Cs, but from the decay of ^{137m}Ba to its stable state.

Caesium-137 has a half-life of about 30.04 years, decaying by beta emission to stable barium-137. About 94.6% of the decays go to a metastable nuclear isomer of barium: barium-137m (^{137m}Ba) and the remainder directly to the ground state. Barium-137m has a half-life of about 153 seconds, its dropping to the ground state usually (85.1% of all ^{137}Cs decays) emitting photons having energy 0.6617 MeV. This is responsible for all of the gamma ray emissions in samples of ^{137}Cs.

== Uses ==
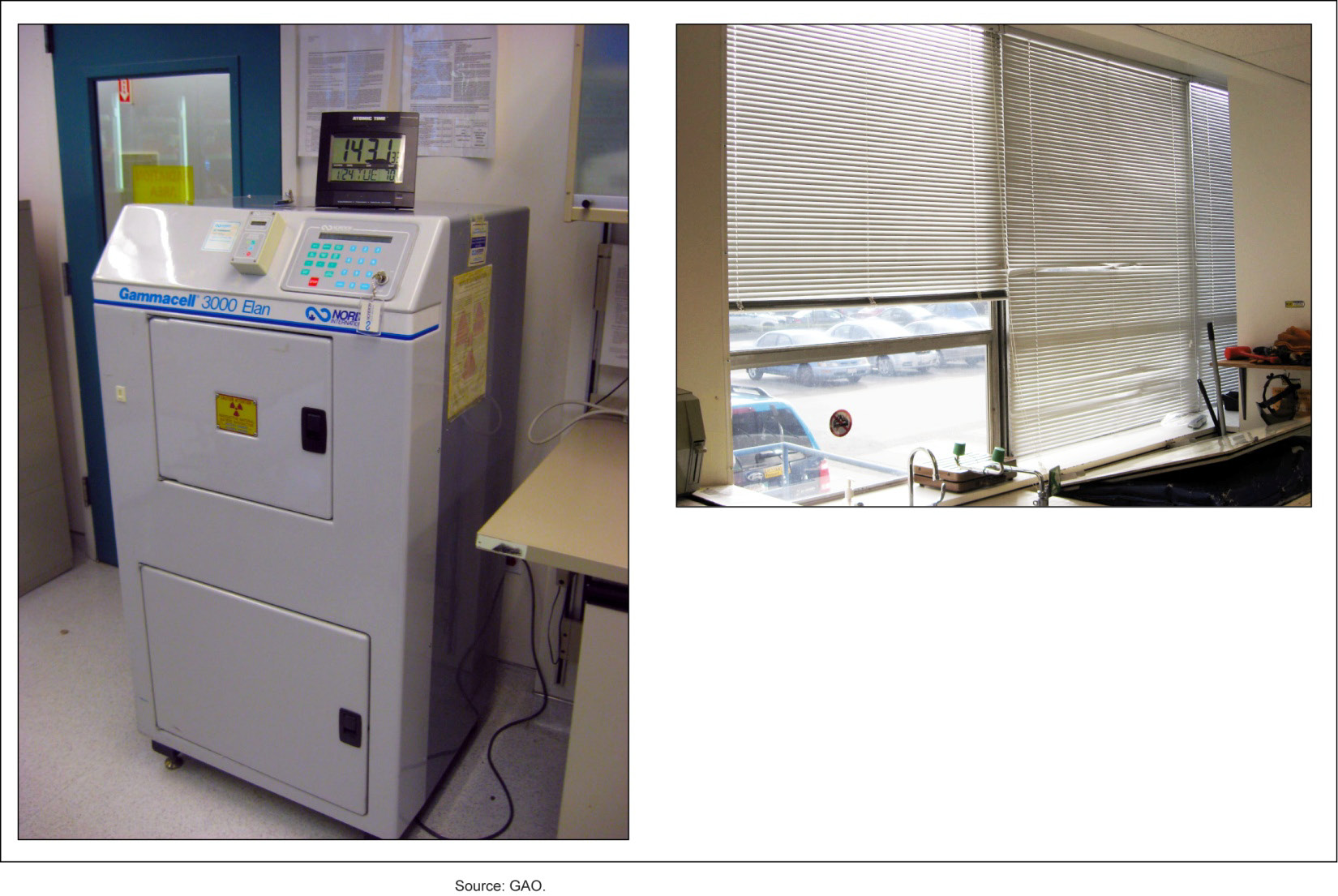
Radiocaesium blood irradiator

Caesium-137 has a number of practical uses. In small amounts, it is used to calibrate radiation-detection equipment.‍ In medicine, it is used in radiation therapy.‍ In industry, it is used in flow meters, thickness gauges,‍ moisture-density gauges (for density readings, with americium-241/beryllium providing the moisture reading),‍ and in borehole logging devices.‍

Caesium-137 is not widely used for industrial radiography because it is hard to obtain a very high specific activity material with a well defined (and small) shape, as caesium from used nuclear fuel contains stable caesium-133 and also long-lived caesium-135. Isotope separation is too costly compared to cheaper alternatives. Also, the higher specific activity caesium sources tend to be made from highly soluble caesium chloride (CsCl); as a result, if a radiography source were to be damaged, the risk of radioactive contamination is high. It is possible to make water-insoluble caesium sources (with ferrocyanides, for example) but their specific activity will be lower. Other chemically inert caesium compounds include caesium-aluminosilicate-glasses akin to the natural mineral pollucite. The latter has been used in demonstrations of chemically stable water-insoluble forms of nuclear waste for disposal in deep geological repositories. A large emitting volume will harm the image quality in radiography. The isotopes ^{192}Ir and ^{60}Co are preferred for radiography, since iridium and cobalt are chemically non-reactive metals and can be obtained with much higher specific activities by the activation of stable ^{191}Ir and ^{59}Co in high-flux reactors. However, while ^{137}Cs is a waste product produced in great quantities in nuclear fission reactors, ^{192}Ir and ^{60}Co are specifically produced in commercial and research reactors and their life cycle entails the destruction of the involved high-value elements. Cobalt-60 decays to stable nickel, whereas iridium-192 can decay to either stable osmium or platinum. Due to the residual radioactivity and legal hurdles, the resulting material is not commonly recovered even from "spent" radioactive sources, meaning in essence that the entire mass is "lost" for non-radioactive uses.

As an almost purely synthetic isotope not existing in the environment before 1945, caesium-137 has been used to date wine and detect counterfeits‍ and as a relative-dating material for assessing the age of sedimentation occurring after 1945.‍

Caesium-137 is also used as a radioactive tracer in geologic research to measure soil erosion and deposition; its affinity for fine sediments is useful in this application.‍

== Health risks ==
The biological behaviour of caesium is similar to that of potassium‍ and rubidium. After entering the body, caesium gets more or less uniformly distributed throughout the body, with the highest concentrations in soft tissue.‍ However, unlike group 2 radionuclides like radium and strontium-90, caesium does not bioaccumulate and is excreted relatively quickly. The biological half-life of caesium is about 70 days.‍ It has been demonstrated that pancreatic tissue is a strong accumulator and secretor in the intestine of radioactive caesium (^{137}Cs). A 1961 experiment showed that mice dosed with 21.5 μCi/g of ^{137}Cs had a 50% fatality rate within 30 days, implying an LD_{50} of 245 μg/kg.‍ A similar experiment in 1972 showed that when dogs are subjected to a whole body burden of 3800 μCi/g (140 MBq/kg, or approximately 44 μg/kg) of caesium-137 (and 950 to 1400 rad), they die within 33 days, while animals with half of that burden all survived for a year.‍ A 1960 mouse study found there were high levels of ^{137}Cs for the first day after exposure in the mucus glands of the colon, the pancreas, cartilage, tendons, and skeletal muscle. After 24 hours, cartilage and skeletal muscle showed the highest activity.‍

In 2003, a study found that children from the ^{137}Cs-polluted area in Belarus near Chernobyl suffered from chronic diseases rarely found in children in other areas of Belarus. Measurements of ^{137}Cs exposure from autopsies performed on 52 children who died of various causes found that the concentration of ^{137}Cs was highest in the thyroid (2054±288 Bq/kg), adrenals (1576±290 Bq/kg), and pancreas (1359±350 Bq/kg), and lowest in the brain (385±72 Bq/kg) and liver (347±61 Bq/kg).‍

Accidental ingestion of caesium-137 can be treated with Prussian blue (Fe^{III}_{4}[Fe^{II}(CN)_{6}]_{3}), which binds to it chemically and reduces its biological half-life to 30 days.‍

== Environmental contamination ==
The ten highest deposits of caesium-137 from U.S. nuclear testing at the Nevada Test Site. Test explosions "Simon" and "Harry" were both from Operation Upshot–Knothole in 1953, while the test explosions "George" and "How" were from Operation Tumbler–Snapper in 1952.

Medium-lived fission products
Nuclide	t_{1/2}	Yield	Q (Note: Decay energy is split among β, neutrino, and γ if any.)	βγ
	(a)	(%) (Note: Per 65 thermal neutron fissions of ^{235}U and 35 of ^{239}Pu.)	(keV)	
^{155}Eu	4.74	0.0803 (Note: Neutron poison; in thermal reactors, most is destroyed by further neutron capture.)	252	βγ
^{85}Kr	10.73	0.2180 (Note: Less than 1/4 of mass-85 fission products as most bypass ground state: ^{85}Br → ^{85m}Kr → ^{85}Rb.)	687	βγ
^{113m}Cd	13.9	0.0008	316	β
^{90}Sr	28.91	4.505	2826 (Note: Has decay energy 546 keV; its decay product ^{90}Y has decay energy 2.28 MeV with weak gamma branching.)	β
^{137}Cs	30.04	6.337	1176	βγ
^{121m}Sn	43.9	0.00005	390	βγ
^{151}Sm	94.6	0.5314	77	β

Caesium-137, along with other radioactive isotopes caesium-134, iodine-131, xenon-133, and strontium-90, were released into the environment during nearly all atmospheric nuclear weapon tests, and more recently some nuclear accidents, most notably the Chernobyl disaster, the Goiânia Accident and the Fukushima Daiichi disaster.

Caesium-137 is produced from the nuclear fission of plutonium and uranium,‍ and by observing the characteristic gamma rays emitted by this isotope, one can determine whether the contents of a given sealed container were made before or after the first atomic bomb explosion (Trinity test, 16 July 1945), which spread some of it into the atmosphere, quickly distributing trace amounts of it around the globe. This procedure has been used by researchers to check the authenticity of certain rare wines, most notably the purported "Jefferson bottles".‍ Surface soils and sediments are also dated by measuring the activity of ^{137}Cs.

=== Nuclear bomb fallout ===
Bombs in the Arctic area of Novaja Zemlja and bombs detonated in or near the stratosphere released caesium-137 that landed in upper Lapland, Finland. Measurements of caesium-137 in the region in the 1960s were reportedly 45,000 becquerels. Figures from 2011 have a midrange of about 1,100 becquerels, but no increase in cancer cases has been identified.‍‍‍

=== Chernobyl disaster ===
As of today and for the next few hundred years or so, caesium-137 and strontium-90 continue to be the principal source of radiation in the zone of alienation around the Chernobyl nuclear power plant, and pose the greatest risk to health, owing to their approximately 30-year half-life and biological uptake. An estimated area of 12000 km² of Germany is contaminated with caesium-137 following the Chernobyl disaster in 1986 with surface activity of 20 to 37 kBq/m^{2}. This corresponds to 1.1% of all caesium-137 released in Europe after the Chernobyl accident. In Scandinavia, some reindeer and sheep exceeded the Norwegian legal limit (3000 Bq/kg) 26 years after Chernobyl.‍ The Chernobyl caesium-137 has now decayed by more than half, but could have been locally concentrated by much larger factors.

=== Fukushima Daiichi disaster ===
Calculated caesium-137 concentration in the air after the Fukushima nuclear disaster, 25 March 2011.

In April 2011, elevated levels of caesium-137 were also being found in the environment after the Fukushima Daiichi nuclear disasters in Japan. In July 2011, meat from 11 cows shipped to Tokyo from Fukushima Prefecture was found to have 1530 to 3200 becquerels per kilogram of ^{137}Cs, considerably exceeding the Japanese legal limit of 500 becquerels per kilogram at that time.‍ In March 2013, a fish caught near the plant had a record 740,000 becquerels per kilogram of radioactive caesium, above the 100 becquerels per kilogram government limit.‍ A 2013 paper in Scientific Reports found that for a forest site 50 kilometres (30 miles) from the stricken plant, ^{137}Cs concentrations were high in leaf litter, fungi and detritivores, but low in herbivores.‍ By the end of 2014, "Fukushima-derived radiocaesium had spread into the whole western North Pacific Ocean", transported by the North Pacific current from Japan to the Gulf of Alaska. It has been measured in the ocean surface layer down to 200 meters (660 feet) and south of the current area down to 400 m (1,300 ft).‍

Caesium-137 is reported to be the major health concern in Fukushima. A number of techniques are being considered that will be able to strip out 80% to 95% of the caesium from contaminated soil and other materials efficiently and without destroying the organic material in the soil. These include hydrothermal blasting. The caesium, precipitated with ferric ferrocyanide (Prussian blue) would be the only waste requiring special burial sites.‍ The aim is to get annual exposure from the contaminated environment down to 1 millisievert (mSv) above background levels. The most contaminated area where radiation doses are greater than 50 mSv/year must remain off-limits, but some areas that are currently less than 5 mSv/year may be decontaminated, allowing 22,000 residents to return.

== Incidents and accidents ==
Caesium-137 gamma sources have been involved in several radiological accidents and incidents.

=== 1987 Goiânia, Goiás, Brazil ===
In the Goiânia accident of 1987, an improperly disposed of radiation therapy system from an abandoned clinic in Goiânia, Brazil, was removed, then cracked to be sold in junkyards. The glowing caesium salt was then sold to curious, unaware buyers.‍ This led to four confirmed deaths and several serious injuries from radiation contamination.‍‍

=== 1989 Kramatorsk, Ukraine ===
The 1989 Kramatorsk incident happened in 1989 when a small capsule 8 by 4 millimetres (0.3 by 0.2 inches) in size of caesium-137 was found inside the concrete wall of an apartment building in Kramatorsk, Ukrainian SSR. It is believed that the capsule, originally a part of a measurement device, was lost in the late 1970s and ended up mixed with gravel used to construct the building in 1980. Over 9 years, two families had lived in the apartment. By the time the capsule was discovered, 6 residents of the building had died, 4 from leukemia and 17 more receiving varying doses of radiation.‍

=== 1994 Tammiku, Estonia ===
The 1994 Tammiku incident involved the theft of radioactive material from a nuclear waste storage facility in Männiku, Saku Parish, Harju County, Estonia. Three brothers, unaware of the facility's nature, broke into a shed while scavenging for scrap metal. One of the brothers received a 4000 rad (40 Gy) whole-body dose from a caesium-137 source that had been released from a damaged container, succumbing to radiation poisoning 12 days later.

=== 1997 Georgia ===
In 1997, several Georgian soldiers suffered radiation poisoning and burns. They were eventually traced back to training sources left abandoned, forgotten, and unlabelled after the dissolution of the Soviet Union. One was a caesium-137 pellet in a pocket of a shared jacket that released about 130,000 times the level of background radiation at a 1-metre (3-foot) distance.‍

=== 1998 Los Barrios, Cádiz, Spain ===
In the Acerinox accident of 1998, the Spanish recycling company Acerinox accidentally melted down a mass of radioactive caesium-137 that came from a gamma-ray generator.‍

=== 2009 Tongchuan, Shaanxi, China ===
In 2009, a Chinese cement company in Tongchuan, Shaanxi Province was demolishing an old, unused cement plant and did not follow standards for handling radioactive materials. This caused some caesium-137 from a measuring instrument to be included with eight truckloads of scrap metal on its way to a steel mill, where the radioactive caesium was melted down into the steel.‍

=== 2015 University of Tromsø, Norway ===
In March 2015, the Norwegian University of Tromsø lost 8 radioactive samples, including samples of caesium-137, americium-241, and strontium-90. The samples were moved out of a secure location to be used for education. When the samples were supposed to be returned, the university was unable to find them. As of 4 November 2015, the samples are still missing.‍‍

=== 2016 Helsinki, Finland ===
On 3 and 4 March 2016, unusually high levels of caesium-137 were detected in the air in Helsinki, Finland. According to Finland's Radiation and Nuclear Safety Authority (STUK), measurements showed 4000 μBq/m^{3}—approximately 1,000 times the usual background level. A STUK investigation traced the source to a building from which STUK itself and a radioactive waste treatment company operate.‍‍

=== 2019 Seattle, Washington, United States ===
Thirteen people were exposed to caesium-137 in May 2019 at the Research and Training building in the Harborview Medical Center complex in Seattle, Washington. A contract crew was transferring the caesium from the lab to a truck when the powder was spilled. Five people were decontaminated and released, but eight who were more directly exposed were taken to the hospital while the research building was evacuated.‍

=== 2023 Western Australia, Australia ===
Public health authorities in Western Australia issued an emergency alert for a stretch of road measuring about 1,400 kilometres (870 miles) after a capsule containing caesium-137 was lost in transport on 25 January 2023. The 8 millimetres (0.3 inches) capsule contained a small quantity of the radioactive material when it disappeared from a truck. The State Government immediately launched a search, with the WA Department of Health's chief health officer Andrew Robertson warning an exposed person could expect to receive the equivalent of "about 10 X-rays an hour". Experts warned, if the capsule were found, the public should stay at least 5 metres (16 feet) away.‍ The capsule was found on 1 February 2023.‍

=== 2023 Prachinburi, Thailand ===
A caesium-137 capsule went missing from a steam power plant in Prachinburi province, Thailand on 23 February 2023, triggering a search by officials from Thailand's Office of Atoms for Peace (OAP) and the Prachinburi provincial administration. However, the Thai public was not notified until 14 March.‍

On 20 March, the Secretary-General of the OAP and the governor of Prachinburi held a press conference stating that they had found caesium-137 contaminated furnace dust at a steel melting plant in Kabin Buri district.‍

=== 2024 Khabarovsk, Russia ===
On 5 April 2024, an emergency regime was introduced in the Russian city of Khabarovsk after a local resident accidentally discovered that radiation levels had jumped sharply in one of the industrial areas of the city. According to volunteers of the dosimetric control group, the dosimeter at the NP site showed up to 800 microsieverts, which is 1600 times the safe value.

Employees of the Ministry of Emergency Situations fenced off the area to 30 by 30 meters (100 by 100 ft), where they found a capsule with caesium from a defectoscope. This was placed in a protective container and taken away for disposal. The incident was first reported by the Novaya Gazeta.‍

=== 2025 Indonesia and United States ===
On 18 August 2025, the United States Food and Drug Administration (FDA) issued a statement indicating that shipments of shrimp from Indonesia had been contaminated. This was only the first of several major recalls of irradiated shrimp processed by the Indonesian company Bahari Makmur Sejati (BMS Foods). The source of the material was traced to a metal scrapyard in the Modern Cikande industrial estate near Jakarta, in which the company supplying the shipping containers was also based.

== See also ==
- Commonly used gamma-emitting isotopes

== Bibliography ==
- Olsen, Rolf A. (1994). "4.2. The Transfer of Radiocaesium from Soil to Plants and Fungi in Seminatural Ecosystems". Nordic Radioecology: The Transfer of Radionuclides Through Nordic Ecosystems to Man. Studies in Environmental Science. Vol. 62. pp. 265–286. doi:10.1016/S0166-1116(08)71715-1. ISBN 978-0-444-81617-7.
