= Uranium(III) hydride =

Names
- Other names Uranium(III) hydride Uranium trihydride Hypouranous hydride

Identifiers
CAS Number	13598-56-6
3D model (JSmol)	Interactive image; Interactive image
ChemSpider	25935465
PubChem CID	71308292
CompTox Dashboard (EPA)	DTXSID1042522
- InChI: InChI=1S/U.3H Key: XOTGRWARRARRKM-UHFFFAOYSA-N
- SMILES: [UH3]; [H-].[H-].[H-].[U+3]

Properties
Chemical formula	UH_{3}
Molar mass	241.053 g·mol^{−1}
Appearance	brownish grey to brownish black pyrophoric powder
Density	10.95 g/cm^{3} (20 °C (68 °F; 293 K))
Solubility in water	Reacts

Structure
Crystal structure	Cubic, cP32
Space group	Pm3̅n, No. 223
Lattice constant	a = 6.643 Å
- Except where otherwise noted, data are given for materials in their standard state (at 25 °C [77 °F], 100 kPa). verify (what is ?) Infobox references

Uranium hydride, also called uranium trihydride (UH_{3}), is an inorganic compound and a hydride of uranium.

== Properties ==
Uranium hydride is a brownish black pyrophoric powder. It has a metallic conductivity, is slightly soluble in hydrochloric acid and decomposes in nitric acid.

Two crystal modifications of uranium hydride exist, both cubic: an α form that is obtained at low temperatures and a β form that is grown when the formation temperature is above 250 °C (482 °F). After growth, both forms are metastable at room temperature and below, but the α form slowly converts to the β form upon heating to 100 °C (212 °F). Both α- and β-UH_{3} are ferromagnetic at temperatures below ~180 K (−136 °F; −93 °C). Above 180 K (−136 °F; −93 °C), they are paramagnetic.

== Formation in uranium metal ==
=== Hydrogen gas reaction ===
Exposure of uranium metal to hydrogen at 250 °C (482 °F) gives the trihydride:

2 U + 3H_{2} → 2UH_{3}

Bulk uranium metal crumbles into a fine powder during the course of the reaction.

The process is reminiscent of hydrogen embrittlement but uranium hydride is not an interstitial compound. Instead, according to X-ray crystallography, each uranium atom is surrounded by 12 atoms of hydrogen (defect perovskite structure). Each hydrogen atom occupies a large tetrahedral hole in the lattice. The density of hydrogen in uranium hydride is approximately the same as in liquid water or in liquid hydrogen. The U−H−U linkage through a hydrogen atom is present in the structure.

=== Water reaction ===
Uranium hydride forms when uranium metal (e.g. in Magnox fuel with corroded cladding) becomes exposed to water or steam, with uranium dioxide as byproduct:

7 U + 6 H_{2}O → 3 UO_{2} + 4 UH_{3}

The resulting uranium hydride is pyrophoric; if the metal (e.g. a damaged fuel rod) is exposed to air afterwards, excessive heat may be generated and the bulk uranium metal itself can ignite. Hydride-contaminated uranium can be passivated by exposure to a gaseous mixture of 98% helium with 2% oxygen. Condensed moisture on uranium metal promotes formation of hydrogen and uranium hydride; a pyrophoric surface may be formed in absence of oxygen. This poses a problem with underwater storage of very special spent nuclear fuel in spent fuel ponds (nuclear fuel from commercial nuclear plants does not contain any uranium metal). Depending on the size and distribution on the hydride particles, self-ignition can occur after an indeterminate length of exposure to air. Such exposure poses risk of self-ignition of fuel debris in radioactive waste storage vaults.

Uranium hydride exposed to water evolves hydrogen. In contact with strong oxidizers this may cause fire and explosions. Contact with halocarbons may cause a violent reaction.

== Reactions ==
UH_{3} releases hydrogen upon heating to near 400 °C (752 °F). In this way bulk uranium can be transformed to a powder with high surface area. The resulting powder is extremely reactive toward H_{2} even at −80 °C (−112 °F).

Hydrogen, deuterium, and tritium can be purified by reacting with uranium, then thermally decomposing the resulting hydride/deuteride/tritide. Extremely pure hydrogen has been prepared from beds of uranium hydride for decades. Heating uranium hydride is a convenient way to introduce hydrogen into a vacuum system. Uranium tritide (UT) is used for the safe and efficient storage of tritium, since gaseous tritium is harder to contain and work with. UT is formed by combining tritium and uranium at room temperature. The tritium can be later extracted by heating the UT. Tritium and its decay product ^{3}He are extracted at different temperatures.

UH_{3} reacts with many compounds at various temperatures to form uranium salts:

Reactions of uranium hydride
Reactant	Temperature	Product
Ammonia	250 °C (482 °F)	Uranium(III) nitride
Bromine	300 °C (572 °F)	Uranium(IV) bromide
Chlorine	250 °C (482 °F)	Uranium(IV) chloride
Hydrogen chloride	300 °C (572 °F)	Uranium(III) chloride
Hydrogen bromide	300 °C (572 °F)	Uranium(III) bromide
Hydrogen fluoride	20 °C (68 °F)	Uranium(IV) fluoride
Hydrogen iodide	300 °C (572 °F)	Uranium(III) iodide
Hydrogen sulfide	400 °C (752 °F)	Uranium(IV) sulfide
Oxygen	20 °C (68 °F)	Triuranium octoxide
Water	350 °C (662 °F)	Uranium dioxide

=== Other ===
Polystyrene-impregnated uranium hydride powder is non-pyrophoric and can be pressed, however its hydrogen-carbon ratio is unfavorable. Hydrogenated polystyrene was introduced in 1944 instead.

Uranium hydride enriched to about 5% uranium-235 (^{235}U) has been proposed as a combined nuclear fuel/neutron moderator for the Hydrogen Moderated Self-regulating Nuclear Power Module. According to the aforementioned patent application, the reactor design in question begins producing power when hydrogen gas at a sufficient temperature and pressure is admitted to the core (made up of granulated uranium metal) and reacts with the uranium metal to form uranium hydride. Uranium hydride is both a nuclear fuel and a neutron moderator; apparently it, like other neutron moderators, will slow neutrons sufficiently to allow for fission reactions to take place; the ^{235}U atoms within the hydride also serve as the nuclear fuel. Once the nuclear reaction has started, it will continue until it reaches a certain temperature, approximately 800 °C (1,470 °F), where, due to the chemical properties of uranium hydride, it chemically decomposes and turns into hydrogen gas and uranium metal. The loss of neutron moderation due to the chemical decomposition of the uranium hydride will consequently slow — and eventually halt — the reaction. When temperature returns to an acceptable level, the hydrogen will again combine with the uranium metal, forming uranium hydride, restoring moderation and the nuclear reaction will start again.

Uranium hydride ion may interfere with some mass spectrometry measurements, appearing as a peak at mass 239, creating false increase of signal for plutonium-239 (^{239}Pu).

== History ==
Uranium hydride slugs were used in the "tickling the dragon's tail" series of experiments to determine the critical mass of uranium.

Uranium hydride and uranium deuteride were suggested as a fissile material for a uranium hydride bomb. The tests with uranium hydride and uranium deuteride during Operation Upshot–Knothole were disappointing, however. During the early phases of the Manhattan Project, in 1943, uranium hydride was investigated as a promising bomb material; it was abandoned by early 1944 as it turned out that such a design would be inefficient.

== Related compounds ==
- Uranium(IV) hydride (UH_{4})
