= RACER IV =

Component of first hydrogen bombs

RACER IV was a component of some of the first hydrogen bombs made by the United States during the 1950s. The RACER was developed in 1953 at Los Alamos National Laboratory.

== Etymology ==
It was named after the snake of the same name as it was customary for Los Alamos to name primary devices after snakes and insects.

== Purpose ==
RACER was the second fusion-boosted fission device type incorporating the principles tested first with the BOOSTER in the Greenhouse Item (the first was the modified MK-7 device tested in Snapper Dog in 1952). It was initially intended to be the first stage for all but two (the SHRIMP and ZOMBIE devices) of the devices tested in the Castle series. The shots intended to make use of it were Romeo (RUNT device), Union (ALARM CLOCK device), and Yankee (JUGHEAD, later RUNT II devices), which tested weapon systems aiming to ensure emergency capability, as well as shots Koon (MORGENSTERN device) and Echo (RAMROD device) which were to test more exotic "next generation" systems. Its reliability issues ruled it out as a primary in the emergency capability devices, whose proper operation was imperative. Nevertheless, it was fielded as primary to the relatively low risk Nectar (ZOMBIE device) with satisfactory performance, and to the highly innovative Koon (MORGENSTERN device) with disastrous effects.

== Development ==
The RACER was developed in 1953 at Los Alamos, was DT gas-boosted, and used a TOM initiator for internal initiation. The boosting capsule was made of steel and was internally lined with copper, a standardisation derived from the Booster Ball tested in the Item test. Inside the capsule, the TOM initiator was nested with a caltrop-like steel mounting. This method of assembly of the TOM initiator was known as sealed initiator, doing away with the mounting bracket employed in earlier pure-fission designs.

== Testing and finalisation ==
Several RACER cores were proof-fired during Upshot–Knothole with mock-up secondary stages as shots Nancy (Mark 14) with DT gas boosting, Badger (Mark 16) with deuterium-only gas boosting, and a redesigned (RACER IV) core as shot Simon (Mark 17/24) with DT gas boosting. In its finalised, RACER IV configuration, two kilograms of HEU were added to the initial (RACER) composite core design. According to Chuck Hansen, during the Upshot-Knothole tests RACER exhibited inconsistent yield, varying from 23 kilotons in the Badger and 24 kilotons in the Nancy shot, to 43 kilotons in the Simon shot (as the revised RACER IV version); the yields lay outside the predicted range of 35-40 kilotons.

== Unpredictability and discontinuation ==
Concomitant to stringent yield predictability and reproducibility requirements, the design's bizarre yields meant that as a primary, RACER did not furnish the proper quantity and strength of x-rays and neutrons to implode and initiate respectively the secondary stage. Both x-ray and neutron fluxes were products of the fission process and the degree of fission in the RACER cores varied unpredictably as shown by the yield variability. The unpredictable neutron flux had a catastrophic impact to the TX-22 program, as the MORGENSTERN prototype fizzled and its sister project RAMROD was canceled due to the poor performance of RACER IV.
