= 1953 in the environment =

This is a list of notable events relating to the environment in 1953. They relate to environmental law, conservation, environmentalism and environmental issues.

Before the environmental movement, the most common phrase used for this concept was "environmental conservation".

== Events ==
- From March 17 to June 5, the United States conducted a series of 11 nuclear test shots called Operation Upshot–Knothole, at the Nevada Test Site. The human side of these events were later made into the 2010 documentary Atomic Mom.
- A number of Protected areas were established in 1953, including Aoraki / Mount Cook National Park in New Zealand, Bōnoma Prefectural Natural Park in Japan, and Cape Hatteras National Seashore in North Carolina.

== See also ==
- Human impact on the environment
- List of environmental issues
- List of years in the environment
