= Plutonium dihydride =

Names
- IUPAC name Plutonium dihydride (excess hydrogen)
- Systematic IUPAC name Plutonium(2+) hydride
- Other names Plutonium dihydride Plutonium(II) hydride Plutonous hydride

Identifiers
CAS Number	17336-52-6
3D model (JSmol)	Interactive image
ChemSpider	57566567
PubChem CID	57464762
CompTox Dashboard (EPA)	DTXSID80726695
- InChI: InChI=1S/Pu.2H/q+2;2*-1 Key: IPKHWWGTRXXYCX-UHFFFAOYSA-N
- SMILES: [H-].[H-].[Pu++]

Properties
Chemical formula	H_{2}Pu
Molar mass	246 g·mol^{−1}
Appearance	Black, opaque crystals
- Except where otherwise noted, data are given for materials in their standard state (at 25 °C [77 °F], 100 kPa). verify (what is ?) Infobox references

Plutonium dihydride is a non-stoichiometric chemical compound with the formula PuH_{2+x}. It is one of two characterized hydrides of plutonium; the other is PuH_{3}. PuH_{2+x} has a composition range of PuH_{2} – PuH_{2.7}. Metastable stoichiometries with an excess of hydrogen (PuH_{2.7} – PuH_{3}) can also be formed. PuH_{2} has a cubic structure. It is readily formed from the elements at 1 atmosphere at 100–200°C: When the stoichiometry is close to PuH_{2} it has a silver appearance, but gets blacker as the hydrogen content increases, additionally the color change is associated with a reduction in conductivity.

Pu + H_{2} → PuH_{2}

Studies of the reaction of plutonium metal with moist air at 200–350 °C showed the presence of cubic plutonium hydride on the surface along with Pu_{2}O_{3}, PuO_{2} and a higher oxide identified by X-ray diffraction and X-ray photoelectron spectroscopy as the mixed-valence phase Pu^{IV}_{3−x}Pu^{VI}_{x}O_{6+x}. Investigation of the reaction performed without heating suggests that the reaction of Pu metal and moist air the production of PuO_{2} and a higher oxide along with adsorbed hydrogen, which catalytically combines with O_{2} to form water.

Like the free metal, plutonium dihydride is pyrophoric. On the surface of hydrided plutonium, it acts as a catalyst for the oxidation of the metal with consumption of both O_{2} and N_{2} from air.

== See also ==
- Uranium hydride bomb
