= Plutonium trihydride =

Names
- IUPAC name Plutonium trihydride
- Other names Plutonium(III) hydride

Identifiers
CAS Number	15457-77-9
3D model (JSmol)	Interactive image
- InChI: InChI=1S/Pu.3H Key: MXUSSOOZHGQFGP-UHFFFAOYSA-N
- SMILES: [PuH3]

Properties
Chemical formula	PuH_{3}
Molar mass	247 g·mol^{−1}
Appearance	grey crystals
Density	9610 kg/m^{3}
Melting point	327 °C (621 °F; 600 K)
Solubility in water	soluble

Related compounds
Other cations	Americium trihydride; Uranium trihydride
- Except where otherwise noted, data are given for materials in their standard state (at 25 °C [77 °F], 100 kPa). Infobox references

Plutonium trihydride is an compound of plutonium and hydrogen with the chemical formula PuH_{3}.

== Synthesis ==
Plutonium reacts noticeably with hydrogen at room temperature and rapidly when heated:

2Pu + 3H_{2} → 2PuH_{3}

Also, heating of plutonium dihydride with hydrogen:

2PuH_{2} + H_{2} → 2PuH_{3}

== Physical properties ==
Plutonium trihydride forms grey crystals of hexagonal crystal structure, with space group P6_{3}/mmc.

== Chemical properties ==
When heated in an ammonia atmosphere, it forms a plutonium nitride:

PuH_{3} + NH_{3} → PuN + 3H_{2}

It reacts with air:

PuH_{3} + O_{2} + N_{2} → Pu_{2}O_{3} + PuN + H_{2}
