= Upshot-Knothole Dixie =

Fourth test-firing of the Operation Upshot-Knothole Atomic Weapon test series

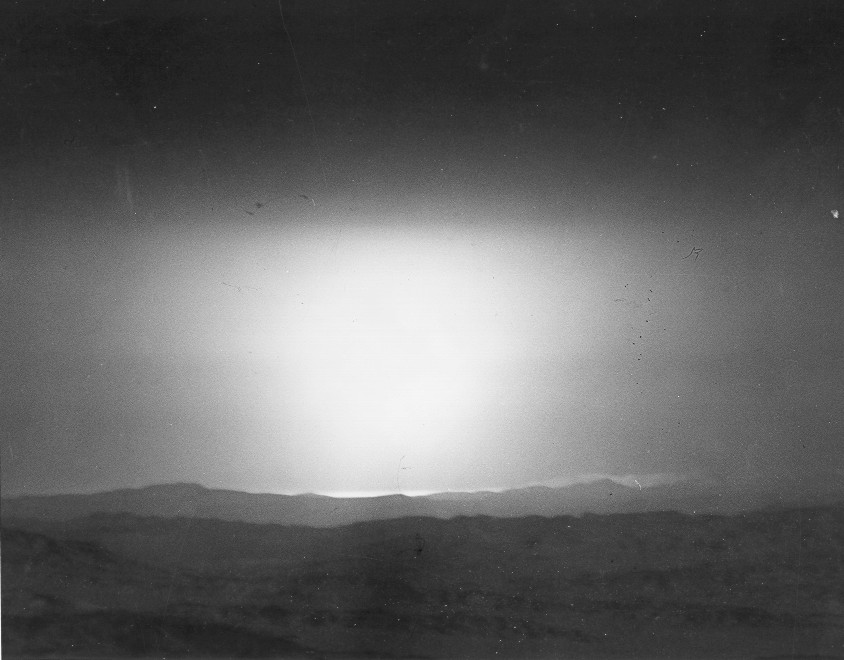

Information
- Country: United States
- Test series: Operation Upshot–Knothole
- Test site: Nevada Test Site
- Date: April 6, 1953
- Test type: Atmospheric
- Yield: 11 kt

Test chronology

Upshot-Knothole Dixie was the fourth test-firing of Operation Upshot–Knothole, an atomic weapons test series conducted in 1953 by the United States at the Nevada Test Site.

Upshot-Knothole Dixie was an 11-kiloton airdrop shot which detonated at 6,000 feet altitude, the highest air burst detonation conducted to that date.

== See also ==
- 1953 in the environment
- Nuclear Test Ban Treaty
- Linus Pauling
