= Uranium hydride bomb =

Type of atomic bomb

The uranium hydride bomb was a variant design of the atomic bomb first suggested by Robert Oppenheimer in 1939 and advocated and tested by Edward Teller. It used deuterium, an isotope of hydrogen, as a neutron moderator in a uranium-deuterium ceramic compact. Unlike all other fission-bomb types, the concept relies on a chain reaction of slow nuclear fission (see neutron temperature). Bomb efficiency was harmed by the slowing of neutrons since the latter delays the reaction, as delineated by Rob Serber in his 1992 extension of the original Los Alamos Primer.

The term hydride for this type of weapon has been subject to misunderstandings in the open literature. While "hydride" might imply that natural hydrogen (which is mostly ^{1}H), is used; only deuterium (^{2}H) has been used for the bomb pits. Likewise, a "hydrogen bomb" uses deuterium and occasionally tritium.

Two uranium deuteride bombs are known to have been tested, the Ruth and Ray test shots during Operation Upshot–Knothole (1953). Both tests produced a yield comparable to 200 tons of TNT each, and were considered to be fizzles. All other nuclear weapons programs have relied on fast neutrons in their weapons designs.

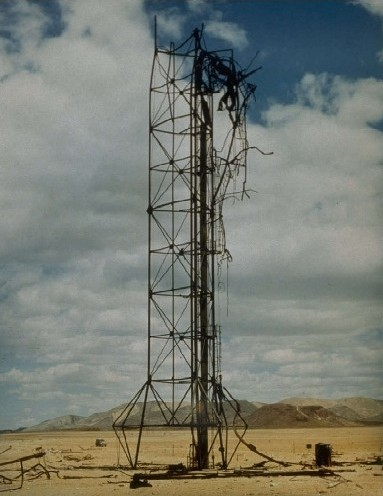
The mangled tower for the Ruth test. The explosion failed to level the testing tower, only somewhat damaging it.

== Theory ==
In early phases of the Manhattan Project, in 1943, uranium deuteride was investigated as a promising bomb material; it was abandoned by early 1944 as it turned out such design would be inefficient. The "autocatalytic" design that emerged from this early research was "Elmer", the discontinued radial-implosion Mark 2 weapon. It made use of uranium deuteride particles coated with paraffin (to reduce the pyrophoricity of UD_{3} aka U^{2}H_{3}) and boron-10 carbide (B_{4}C) wax distributed uniformly throughout the solid core. (Note: The distribution of boron-10 was apparently more useful, and it did away with the earlier and cumbersome "Boron Bubble" scheme.) A composite lead and B_{4}C tamper was envisioned, with about 10.5 kg of active material (i.e. UD_{3}) in one version, and a BeO tamper with 8.45 kg of active material in another.

The deuterium in uranium deuteride (UD_{3}) or plutonium deuteride (PuD_{3}) moderates (slows down) the neutrons, thereby increasing the nuclear cross section for neutron absorption. The result should have been a lower required critical mass; reducing the amount of ^{235}U or ^{239}Pu needed. At the same time, due to the moderating effect of deuterium, the compression requirements are (at least in principle) relaxed somewhat, which would permit assembly of additional fissile material in the core, as well as a radial-implosion assembly, which was much simpler and compact than the one destined for the MK 3. In reality the result was that the slower neutrons delayed the reaction time too much by reducing the number of fission generations accomplished; especially as the core expanded to reach its snowplow region (where all nuclear reactions cease), more neutrons could escape from the turbulent surface of the core, and before enough energy (for military applications) could be produced. In all, neutron moderation sharply reduced the efficiency of the weapon before the inertial confinement failed. It was realized that the result would be a fizzle instead of full-scale detonation. The predicted yield was around 1 kilotonne of TNT (4.2 TJ), if the core operated as originally expected; the first rough estimate for the behavior of the "hydride" bomb appeared in 1944, when James Conant forecast that 1 kt of energy would be obtained from about 9 kg of UD_{3}.

Post-war, LANL physicists continued research on the subject at low priority; while a Monte-Carlo simulation in December 1949 showed that the core could in principle work and result in a weapon considerably smaller than the MK 5, strong skepticism arose as the inherently low efficiency of the fuel would not improve even remotely as theoretically envisioned when a hollow core and boosting were incorporated, and a proposed test of such a core in an MK 4 high-explosive assembly was ultimately stricken from the preliminary shot schedule of operation Greenhouse.

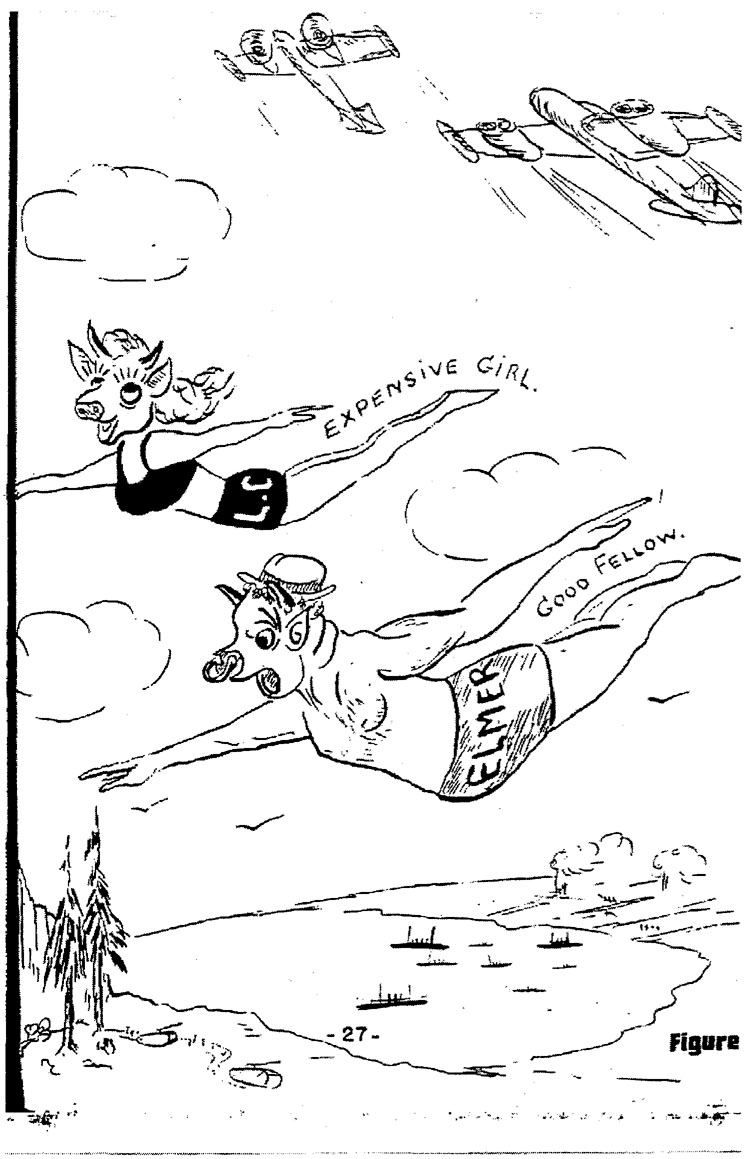
A cartoon by George Gamow showing the MK 2 "Elmer" and the MK 8 "Elsie" weapons, depicting the MK 2 (the "good fellow") as clumsy and unattractive.

== UCRL tests ==
Film of the Ruth detonation.

Skepticism from Los Alamos notwithstanding, Edward Teller remained interested in the concept, and he and Ernest Lawrence experimented with such devices in the early 1950s at the UCRL, (University of California Radiation Laboratory, later Lawrence Livermore National Laboratory). Optimism in the new lab prompted UCRL to even propose a class of such "small weapons" making use of the material, dubbing it as the "Geode". The "Geode"-type devices would be compact, linear (two-point) implosion, gas-boosted fission weapons using hollow spheroidal metallic uranium, or partially ("slightly") moderated cores, where a metallic uranium or plutonium shell was lined internally with UD_{3} (Note: hence the name geodes, which usually consist of spheroidal cavities lined internally with crystals.) producing yields of the order of 10 kt. Applications for this class of devices would be tactical nuclear weapons, as well as primaries for compact thermonuclear systems. The "Geodes" were essentially forerunners of the "Swan" and its derivatives (like the "Swift" and "Swallow" devices). (Note: The names of the devices all followed the initials of Small Weapons.)

Two test devices were fielded in 1953 as part of operation Upshot–Knothole. The principal aim of the University of California Radiation Laboratory designs was a preliminary nucleonics investigation for a spherical deuterated polyethylene charge containing uranium deuteride as a candidate thermonuclear fuel for the "Radiator", an early incarnation of the "Morgenstern". It was hoped that deuterium would fuse (become an active medium) in the secondary's core if compressed appropriately through radiation implosion. The fuel was selected so that UCRL's thermonuclear program would not compete with LASL's on scarce materials at the time, specifically lithium. (Note: The idea of cheap thermonuclear fuels was pursued by UCRL with the design of the "Water Boiler", a primitive type of two-stage thermonuclear gadgets and an early design concept of the "Radiator", that would use heavy water solutions of uranyl fluoride. They were essentially transferred from LASL to UCRL and follow-up investigations to experiments from 1952 conducted in LASL on behalf of Teller, and shortly before the latter's departure from LASL to the newly fledged UCRL.) If successful, the devices could also lead to a compact primary containing minimal amount of fissile material, and powerful enough to ignite Ramrod the other Mark 22 nuclear bomb prototype designed by UCRL at the time. For a hydride-type primary, the degree of compression would not make deuterium to fuse, thus the design would be essentially a pure fission weapon, not a boosted one. The devices themselves as tested in Upshot-Knothole were experimental systems, not weapon prototypes, and were not designed to be used as weapons, or thermonuclear primaries. The cores consisted of a mix of uranium deuteride (UD_{3}), powder-compacted with deuterated polyethylene. No boron was used. The cores tested in Upshot-Knothole used different "mix" (or enrichment) of uranium moderated by deuterium. The predicted yield was 1.5 to 3 kt for Ruth (with a maximum potential yield of 20 kt) and 0.5-1 kt for Ray. The tests produced yields of about 200 tons of TNT each; both tests were considered to be fizzles.

Ruth, which used deuterium and enriched uranium in a solid spherical pit with a natural uranium tamper, was the first device almost-entirely designed at Livermore; it was fired on March 31, 1953, at 05:00 local time (13:00 GMT) at Mercury, Nevada. The explosive device, "Hydride I", used a MK-6 HE assembly made of Composition B and Baratol explosive lenses, and an XMC-305 betatron was provided for initiation through photofission, weighed 7,400 lb (3,400 kg) and was 56 inches (140 cm) in diameter and 66 inches (170 cm) long. The nuclear system weighed 6,750 lb (3,060 kg). Defying the 1.5–3 kt predictions, its actual yield was only 200 tons. Wally Decker, a young Laboratory engineer, characterized the sound the shot made as "pop." The device failed to "automatically declassify" its test site, where the lower 100 ft (30 m) of the 300-foot (91 m) testing tower remained intact, the middle third scattered across the test area and only the upper third vaporized.

The second device, tested in the Ray event, used deuterium and a different concentration of enriched uranium in its solid spherical pit. The device was called "Hydride II", and it also used a MK-6 HE assembly; it was likewise initiated by an XMC-305 betatron fired at known time. Being a sister device to "Hydride I", the "Hydride II" device only had a different pit "fuel" mix, and shared the same dimensions and weight with the Ruth test device. It was fired in a cab, atop a 100-foot (30 m) tower on April 11, 1953. Although shot Ray leveled its tower, the yield was a meager 220 tons; while it did better than Ruth, the yield was still about a tenth of the predicted 0.5–1 kt value.
