= Uranium hydride =

Uranium hydride may refer to the following chemical compounds:

- Uranium(III) hydride
- Uranium(IV) hydride

== See also ==
- Uranium hydride bomb
