= Upshot-Knothole Harry =

1953 American nuclear weapons test

Upshot–Knothole Harry
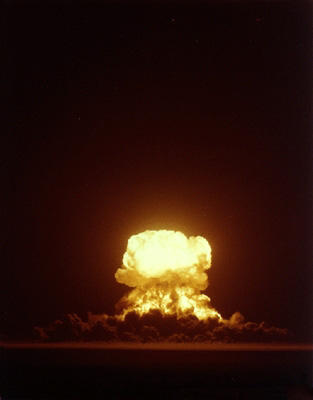

Information
- Country: United States
- Test series: Operation Upshot–Knothole
- Test site: Nevada Test Site
- Date: May 19, 1953
- Test type: Atmospheric (tower)
- Yield: 32 kt

Test chronology

Upshot–Knothole Harry (UK#9) was a nuclear weapons test conducted by the United States as part of Operation Upshot–Knothole. It took place at the recorded time of 04:05 (05:05 hrs) hours, on May 19, 1953, in Yucca Flat, in the Nevada Test Site. The sponsor of the test was the National Laboratory of the United States of America located at Los Alamos.

== Device ==
The test device, codenamed Hamlet, was detonated atop a 300-foot (91 m) tower, the device produced a yield of 32 kilotonnes. The device had a diameter of 56 inches (1,400 mm) and a length of 66 inches (1,700 mm). Its weight was 4 short tons (3.6 t).

The device was designed by Ted Taylor at the Los Alamos National Laboratory of the United States of America, and is distinguished from all others because it was the most efficient pure fission design with a yield below 100 kt ever tested. The design utilized a new hollow core concept. The concept was termed as "radical implosion system" aiming towards reducing the amount of fissionable materials present in the weapon's core while generating moderately high yield.

== Detonation ==
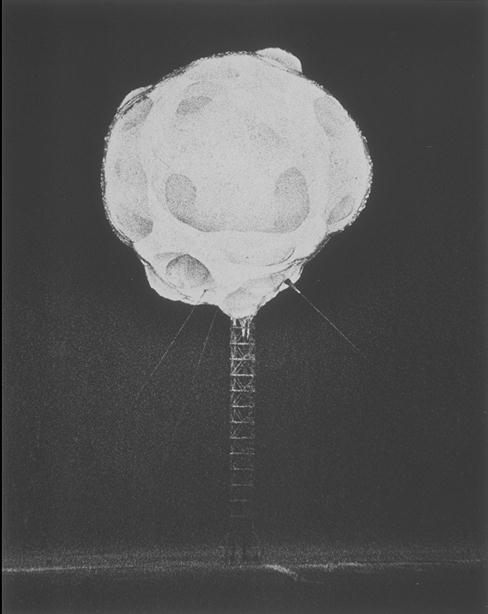
A picture taken about a hundredth of a second after ignition.

The device was detonated in Area 3 of the test site.

== Deposition ==
Of the 11 Upshot–Knothole tests, the so-called Harry test deposited the 3rd highest amount of Caesium-137, Niobium-95, Strontium-90, Zirconium-95, the fourth highest deposit for Niobium-95m, Praseodymium-144, fifth for Uranium-240, Ruthenium-106, sixth for Iodine-131, Tellurium-127m, eighth for deposition of Cobalt-60, tenth for deposition of Europium-155, thirteenth for Strontium-89, Yttrium-90, and sixteenth for Beryllium-7, (the source lists Sr-90 twice, at 3rd and thirteenth, thirteenth was omitted here). The deposition pattern was most similar to test name CLIMAX.

Monitoring personnel including United States of America Atomic Energy Commission personnel monitored the resultant radioactive fallout in areas including St. George, Utah. Fallout from the test fell on 3046 counties of the United States. Due to a miscalculation and change in wind-direction, this Upshot–Knothole test released an unusually large amount of fallout (the highest of any test in the continental U.S.), much of which later accumulated in the vicinity of St. George, Utah. Because of this, the shot would become known as "Dirty Harry" in the press when details were released publicly. It would be among the most controversial of the U.S. nuclear weapon tests. Two years after the blast, Howard Hughes filmed the motion picture The Conqueror near St. George. The cast and crew totaled 220 people. By the end of 1980, as ascertained by People magazine, 91 of them had developed some form of cancer and 46 had died of the disease, including the main stars John Wayne and Susan Hayward.

Hicks (1981) evaluated the gamma-exposure rates and levels of radionuclides. Within the report by Hicks he was required to omit data of U-233, U-235, U-238 & Pu-239, and Pu-240 in order to make the report unclassified.

In measurement of cumulative exposures rates of populations within a 300-mile radius of the test site, of the period 1951 to 1959, the Upshot–Knothole tests was found to have produced 50% (rounded figure) of exposure rate within the population. Of the 50%, 75% (rounded figure) was due to the test-shot Harry.

== See also ==
- Downwinders
