= Uranium(III) bromide =

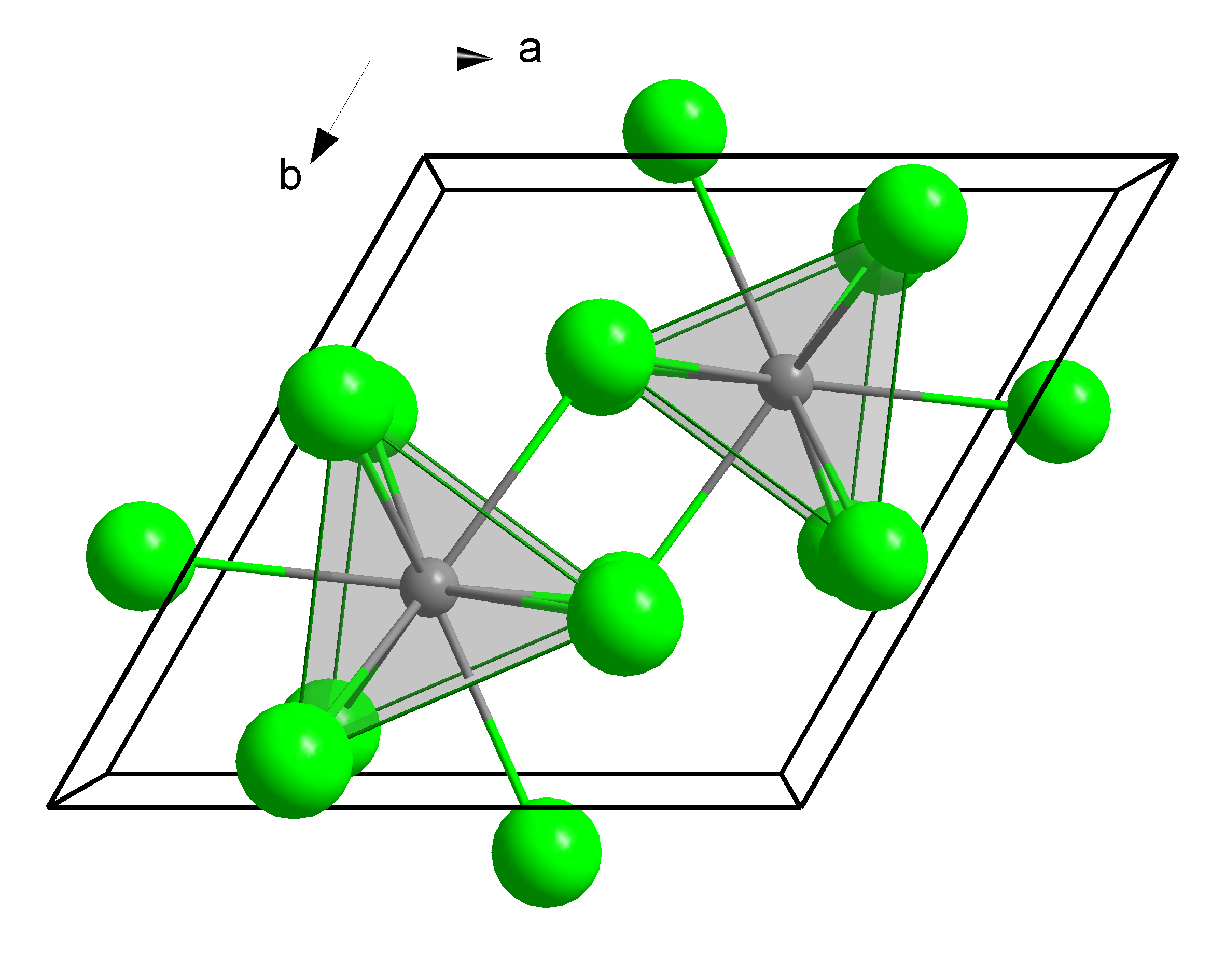

Identifiers
CAS Number	13470-19-4
3D model (JSmol)	Interactive image
ChemSpider	122993
PubChem CID	139470
CompTox Dashboard (EPA)	DTXSID50158868
- InChI: InChI=1S/3BrH.U/h3*1H;/q;;;+3/p-3 Key: TYEZTGPOVBHTQW-UHFFFAOYSA-K
- SMILES: Br[U](Br)Br

Properties
Chemical formula	UBr_{3}
Molar mass	477.741
Appearance	brown solid
- Except where otherwise noted, data are given for materials in their standard state (at 25 °C [77 °F], 100 kPa). Infobox references

Uranium(III) bromide is an inorganic compound with the chemical formula UBr_{3}. It is radioactive.

== Preparation ==
Uranium(III) bromide can be obtained by the reaction of uranium metal or uranium(III) hydride and hydrogen bromide, or it can also be prepared by the thermal decomposition of NH_{4}UBr_{4}·1.5CH_{3}CN·6H_{2}O. It is difficult to synthesize due to its rapid oxidation in both water and air.
