= Bōnoma Prefectural Natural Park =

Prefectural Natural Park in Kagoshima Prefecture, Japan

Bōnoma Prefectural Nature Park
- 坊野間県立自然公園
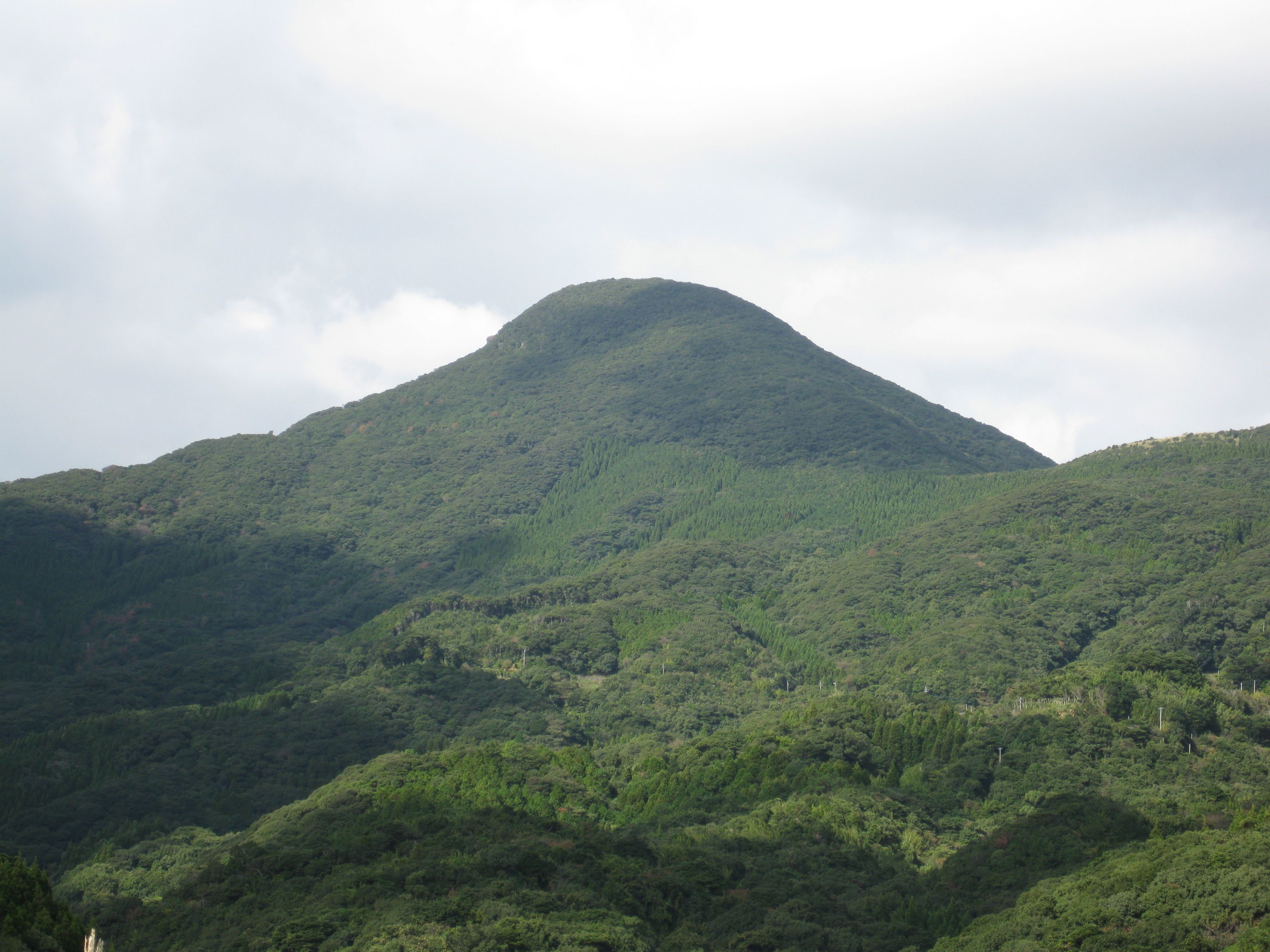
- Mount Noma

- Location within Kagoshima Prefecture Location within Japan
- Location: Kagoshima Prefecture, Japan
- Coordinates: 31.325°N 130.2°E
- Area: 23.40 km^{2} (9.03 sq mi)
- Established: 31 March 1953

Bōnoma Prefectural Nature Park (坊野間県立自然公園, Bōnoma kenritsu shizen kōen) is a Prefectural Nature Park in southwest Kagoshima Prefecture, Japan. Established in 1953, the park spans the municipalities of Makurazaki and Minamisatsuma.

== See also ==
- National Parks of Japan
