= Atomic Mom =

- Film poster
- Directed by: M.T. Silvia
- Produced by: M.T. Silvia, Sarah Dunham
- Starring: Pauline Silvia, Emiko Okada
- Cinematography: Kazushi Kuroda
- Edited by: Jennifer Chinlund
- Music by: Marco d’Ambrosio, Klaudia Promessi
- Distributed by: Women Make Movies and Smartgirl Productions
- Release date: October 10, 2010
- Running time: 87 minutes
- Country: United States
- Languages: English, Japanese [English Subtitles]

Atomic Mom is a 2010 documentary film written and directed by M.T. Silvia about the complex experiences of two women struggling with the emotional repercussions of their connections to the nuclear bombings on Hiroshima, Japan, at the end of World War II in August 1945.

== Synopsis ==
Atomic Mom is a documentary film written and directed by M.T Silvia, which focuses on the connection between two mothers that are each on a different end of the Hiroshima atomic warfare spectrum: Pauline Silvia, a United States Navy biologist, and one of the only women scientists present during the 1953 radiation detonations of Operation Upshot–Knothole at the then-Nevada Test Site, and Emiko Okada, a Japanese woman who was exposed to radiation from the Hiroshima nuclear bombings as a child. Atomic Mom also offers a comparison of the Hiroshima Peace Memorial Museum and the National Atomic Testing Museum in Las Vegas, Nevada. Through the use of numerous interviews with Japanese doctors, historians and Hiroshima survivors, M.T Silvia discusses matters of censorship, value of scientific innovation, human rights, personal responsibility and the prospect of world peace in the aftermath of Hiroshima.

== Interviews ==
- Pauline Silvia
- Emiko Okada
- Mary Palevsky
- Andy Kirk
- Ray Harbert
- Shuntaro Hida
- Dr. Helen Caldicott

== Production ==
Despite accruing multiple professional filmography credits for her studio management work on various Pixar films, Atomic Mom was the first internationally recognized film that M.T Silvia produced and directed as an independent film maker.

Funding for the film was procured from dozens of individual donors as well as Nevada Humanities, Rhode Island Council for the Humanities, The Pacific Pioneer Fund, and Google Matching Funds.

== Reception ==
Robert Jacobs of The Asia-Pacific Journal called Atomic Mom “ambitious” and “complex”, and praised Silvia for making a “film that is both historically compelling and deeply personal, a rare achievement.”

== Awards ==
- 2011: Audience Award for Best Feature Documentary at the Sacramento Film and Music Festival
- 2011: Jury Award for Best Feature Documentary at the Thin Line Film Festival
- 2011: Silver Palm Award for Feature Documentary at the Mexico City International Film Festival
- 2011: Gold Medal for Excellence in Music : Marco d'Ambrosio & Klaudia Promessi at the Park City Film Music Festival

== Festivals/Screenings ==
United States

- Mill Valley Film Festival (California)
- Sacramento Film and Music Festival
- Thin Line Film Festival (Texas)
- Los Angeles Women's International Film Festival
- Women's International Film & Arts Festival (Florida)
- Sarasota Film Festival
- Riverside International Film Festival (California)
- Park City Film Music Festival (Utah)
- New Jersey International Film Festival
- Rhode Island International Film Festival
- The White Sands International Film Festival (New Mexico)
- Southern Utah International Documentary Film Festival
- Big Bear Lake International Film Festival
- Global Peace Film Festival (Florida)
- Citizen Jane Film Festival (Missouri)
- Kansas City International Film Festival
- LA Femme Film Festival
- 14th United Nations Association Film Festival
- Red Rock Film Festival (Utah)

International

- Mexico City International Film Festival
- Hiroshima Peace Film Festival (Japan)
- Off Plus Camera International Festival of Independent Cinema (Poland)
- Addis International Film Festival (Ethiopia)
- International Uranium Film Festival (Brazil)

Other Screenings

- Women's International League for Peace and Freedom – Screening Preview
- San Francisco International Women's Film Festival - Screening and Panel Discussion
- UCLA – Screening and Panel Discussion
- Women's Action for New Directions, Mothers' Day Peace Event (Michigan)
- International Campaign Against Nuclear Weapons, Australian Centre for the Moving Image Melbourne, Australia
