= Operation Upshot–Knothole =

Series of 1950s US nuclear tests

- Upshot-Knothole Grable, 15 kilotons.

Information
- Country: United States
- Test site: NTS Areas 5, 11, Frenchman Flat; NTS, Areas 1-4, 6-10, Yucca Flat
- Period: 1953
- Number of tests: 11
- Test type: free air drop, gun deployed, tower
- Max. yield: 61 kilotonnes of TNT (260 TJ)

Test series chronology

Operation Upshot–Knothole was a series of eleven nuclear test shots conducted in 1953 at the Nevada Test Site. It followed Operation Ivy and preceded Operation Castle.

Over 21,000 soldiers took part in the ground exercise Desert Rock V in conjunction with the Upshot-Knothole Grable shot. Grable was a 280mm Artillery Fired Atomic Projectile (AFAP) shell fired from the "Atomic Cannon" and was viewed by a number of high-ranking military officials.

The test series was notable as containing the first time an AFAP shell was fired (GRABLE Shot), the first two shots (both fizzles) by University of California Radiation Laboratory—Livermore (now Lawrence Livermore National Laboratory), and for testing out some of the thermonuclear components that would be used for the massive thermonuclear series of Operation Castle. One primary device (RACER) was tested in thermonuclear system mockup assemblies of TX-14, TX-16, and TX-17/TX-24, to examine and evaluate the behaviour of radiation cases and the compression of the secondary geometries by the primary's x-rays prior to full-scale testing during Castle. Following RACER's dodgy performance, the COBRA primary was used in the emergency capability ALARM CLOCK, JUGHEAD, RUNT I, RUNT II thermonuclear devices, as well as in the SHRIMP device. RACER IV (as redesigned and proof-tested in the Simon test) was employed as primary for the ZOMBIE, RAMROD and MORGENSTERN devices.

Navy scientist Pauline Silvia conducted experiments during the tests, and would later be profiled in the 2010 documentary Atomic Mom.

== Nuclear tests ==
=== Annie ===
Planned yield for Annie was 15 kilotonnes of TNT (63 TJ), actual yield based on radiochemical analysis was 16.2 kilotonnes of TNT (68 TJ).

=== Nancy ===
Planned yield for Nancy was 40 kilotonnes of TNT (170 TJ), actual yield based on radiochemical analysis was 24.5 kilotonnes of TNT (103 TJ).

=== Simon ===
Planned yield for Simon was 33 kilotonnes of TNT (140 TJ), actual yield based on radiochemical analysis was 43.4 kilotonnes of TNT (182 TJ).

=== Harry ===
Planned yield for Harry was 37 kilotonnes of TNT (150 TJ), actual yield based on radiochemical analysis was 27 kilotonnes of TNT (110 TJ).

=== Encore ===
Planned yield for Encore was 31 kilotonnes of TNT (130 TJ), actual yield based on radiochemical analysis was 26 kilotonnes of TNT (110 TJ).

Operation Upshot-Knothole (1953) AEC preliminary test film report.

== List of tests ==
United States' Upshot-Knothole series tests and detonations
Name (Note: The US, France and Great Britain have code-named their test events, while the USSR and China did not, and therefore have only test numbers (with some exceptions – Soviet peaceful explosions were named). Word translations into English in parentheses unless the name is a proper noun. A dash followed by a number indicates a member of a salvo event. The US also sometimes named the individual explosions in such a salvo test, which results in "name1 – 1(with name2)". If test is canceled or aborted, then the row data like date and location discloses the intended plans, where known.)	Date time (UT)	Local time zone (Note: To convert the UT time into standard local, add the number of hours in parentheses to the UT time; for local daylight saving time, add one additional hour. If the result is earlier than 00:00, add 24 hours and subtract 1 from the day; if it is 24:00 or later, subtract 24 hours and add 1 to the day. Historical time zone data obtained from the IANA time zone database.)	Location (Note: Rough place name and a latitude/longitude reference; for rocket-carried tests, the launch location is specified before the detonation location, if known. Some locations are extremely accurate; others (like airdrops and space blasts) may be quite inaccurate. "~" indicates a likely pro-forma rough location, shared with other tests in that same area.)	Elevation + height (Note: Elevation is the ground level at the point directly below the explosion relative to sea level; height is the additional distance added or subtracted by tower, balloon, shaft, tunnel, air drop or other contrivance. For rocket bursts the ground level is "N/A". In some cases it is not clear if the height is absolute or relative to ground, for example, Plumbbob/John. No number or units indicates the value is unknown, while "0" means zero. Sorting on this column is by elevation and height added together.)	Delivery (Note: Atmospheric, airdrop, balloon, gun, cruise missile, rocket, surface, tower, and barge are all disallowed by the Partial Nuclear Test Ban Treaty. Sealed shaft and tunnel are underground, and remained useful under the PTBT. Intentional cratering tests are borderline; they occurred under the treaty, were sometimes protested, and generally overlooked if the test was declared to be a peaceful use.) Purpose (Note: Include weapons development, weapon effects, safety test, transport safety test, war, science, joint verification and industrial/peaceful, which may be further broken down.)	Device (Note: Designations for test items where known, "?" indicates some uncertainty about the preceding value, nicknames for particular devices in quotes. This category of information is often not officially disclosed.)	Yield (Note: Estimated energy yield in tons, kilotons, and megatons. A ton of TNT equivalent is defined as 4.184 gigajoules (1 gigacalorie).)	Fallout (Note: Radioactive emission to the atmosphere aside from prompt neutrons, where known. The measured species is only iodine-131 if mentioned, otherwise it is all species. No entry means unknown, probably none if underground and "all" if not; otherwise notation for whether measured on the site only or off the site, where known, and the measured amount of radioactivity released.)	References	Notes
Annie	March 17, 1953 13:20:00.3	PST (-8 hrs)	NTS Area 3 37.0477°N 116.022°W	1,230 m (4,040 ft) + 90 m (300 ft)	tower, weapons development	TX-5HE "XR-3" Type D pit	16 kt	I-131 detected, 2.4 MCi (89 PBq)		Investigated yield-vs-initiation time curve. Live news coverage. Desert Rock V. Two 2-story houses, 50 autos, bomb shelters in effects test.
Nancy	March 24, 1953 13:10:00.0	PST (-8 hrs)	NTS Area 4 37.0955°N 116.1037°W	1,230 m (4,040 ft) + 90 m (300 ft)	tower, weapons development	TX-14 "Nevada Zombie"	24 kt	I-131 detected, 3.6 MCi (130 PBq)		Component test of TX-14 containing minimal quantities of Li-6D. Desert Rock V. First proof-test of the RACER boosted primary with disappointing performance. (Note: Apparently the device name is a misnomer, as it implies that the device tested was related to the TX-15 "ZOMBIE". However, this is not the case; no thermonuclear component testing of TX-15 appears to have been conducted during this operation, since Upshot-Knothole tested radiation implosion mockups, containing primaries and mocked-up secondaries with small amounts of enriched Li-6 for the TX-14, TX-16, and TX-17/24 thermonuclear prototype systems, all slated to be proof-fired during CASTLE.)
Ruth	March 31, 1953 13:00:00.0	PST (-8 hrs)	NTS Area 7 37.0827°N 116.0248°W	1,270 m (4,170 ft) + 90 m (300 ft)	tower, weapons development	MK-6 "Hydride I"	200 t	I-131 detected, 28 kCi (1,000 TBq)		1st UCRL device, a uranium deuteride core, meant to explore deuterated polyethylene mixed with uranium as thermonuclear fuel, and if successful to lead also to a compact thermonuclear primary. Predicted yield was 1.5 to 3 kilotons, max. theoretical was 20 kt. Device fizzled - deuterium moderated (slowed-down) neutrons more than expected and quenched the reaction. Embarrassing for designers, as it left 200 ft (61 m) of tower still standing (see image of tower).
Dixie	April 6, 1953 15:29:38.4	PST (-8 hrs)	NTS Area 7 37.0847°N 116.0189°W	1,284 m (4,213 ft) + 1,830 m (6,000 ft)	free air drop, weapons development	MK-5D "DD-1"	11 kt	I-131 detected, 1.7 MCi (63 PBq)		TX-5D proof test, a boosting experiment using lithium deuteride in solid or crystalline form, investigating initiation via deuterium; a cheap method to initiate a chain reaction. Exploded 600 ft (180 m) ENE of intended zero point.
Ray	April 11, 1953 12:44:59.8	PST (-8 hrs)	NTS Area 4 37.09889°N 116.09332°W	1,296 m (4,252 ft) + 30 m (98 ft)	tower, weapons development	MK-6 "Hydride II"	220 t	I-131 detected, 28 kCi (1,000 TBq)		2nd UCRL device, uranium deuteride meant to explore deuterated polyethylene mixed with uranium as thermonuclear fuel, and if successful to lead also to a compact thermonuclear primary; Used different mix from Ruth and it also fizzled. A 100-foot tower was apparently used to avoid embarrassment in case of fizzle.
Badger	April 18, 1953 12:35:00.0	PST (-8 hrs)	NTS Area 2 37.1383°N 116.1187°W	1,370 m (4,490 ft) + 90 m (300 ft)	tower, weapons development	TX-16 "Buzzard"	23 kt	I-131 detected, 3.6 MCi (130 PBq)		Component test of the TX-16 using a cryogenic mockup secondary and the TX-16 radiation case. Also tested RACER primary, which performed below expectations again. Desert Rock V.
Simon	April 25, 1953 12:29:59.8	PST (-8 hrs)	NTS Area 1 37.053°N 116.1036°W	1,294 m (4,245 ft) + 90 m (300 ft)	tower, weapons development	TX-17/24 "Simultaneity"	43 kt	I-131 detected, 6.3 MCi (230 PBq)		Component test of TX-17/24 series using the RACER IV primary, a modified RACER core containing two additional kilograms of HEU in the original design tested in Nancy, a thermonuclear secondary mockup.
Encore	May 8, 1953 15:29:55.4	PST (-8 hrs)	NTS Area 5 36.8°N 115.929°W	940 m (3,080 ft) + 740 m (2,430 ft)	free air drop, weapon effect	MK-6D	27 kt	I-131 detected, 3.9 MCi (140 PBq)		"Effects" test. Dropped 950 ft (290 m) SSW of target. Desert Rock V, bad exposures for troops and bad downwinder fallout.
Harry	May 19, 1953 12:04:59.5	PST (-8 hrs)	NTS Area 3 37.0402°N 116.0261°W	1,224 m (4,016 ft) + 90 m (300 ft)	tower, weapons development	TX-13D "Hamlet"	32 kt	I-131 detected, 4.6 MCi (170 PBq)		New hollow core design, most efficient pure-plutonium device under 100 kt indicates very good compression. Major effects testing of a high elevation explosion. Heaviest downwind contamination measured.
Grable	May 25, 1953 15:30:00.3	PST (-8 hrs)	Launch from NTS Areas 5, 11, Frenchman Flat: 5 36.70428°N 115.97387°W, elv: 950 + 5 m (3,117 + 16 ft); Detonation over NTS 36.793°N 115.9156°W	960 m (3,150 ft) + 160 m (520 ft)	gun deployed, weapon effect	W9 AFAP "Gun"	15 kt	I-131 detected, 2.1 MCi (78 PBq)		The 2nd of four gun-type device tests. Fired from the M65 Atomic Cannon "Atomic Annie" 11 km (6.8 mi) downrange. 280mm shell, 365 kg (805 lb). Detonation at 200 feet (61 m) SW of target. Desert Rock V. Major effects test.
Climax	June 4, 1953 11:14:56.7	PST (-8 hrs)	NTS Area 7 37.0875°N 116.0192°W	1,288 m (4,226 ft) + 410 m (1,350 ft)	free air drop, weapons development	MK-7, "Cobra", Type D pit	61 kt	I-131 detected, 8.6 MCi (320 PBq)		Proof test of a boosted MK-7 device, intended to be used as a primary in Castle. Initially it was intended only for the TX-15. After RACER's inconsistent behaviour it was opted for all "emergency capability" devices instead.. The bomb detonated 320 ft (98 m) NW of target. Composite implosion system in a Type D pit. Used Cyclotol 75/25 explosive mixture.

== Gallery ==
Full uncut detonation of Upshot-Knothole Grable, launched out of the Atomic Annie device on 5/25/1953. The footage at normal speed is about 2 1/2 minutes.

Close-up slow motion shot of Grable fire-ball, mach-stem and surface effects,

Upshot-Knothole Encore, 27-kilotons.

Upshot-Knothole Ruth, 0.2-kilotons.

Upshot-Knothole Ruth, Note close proximity to highway in foreground as to the scale of detonation.

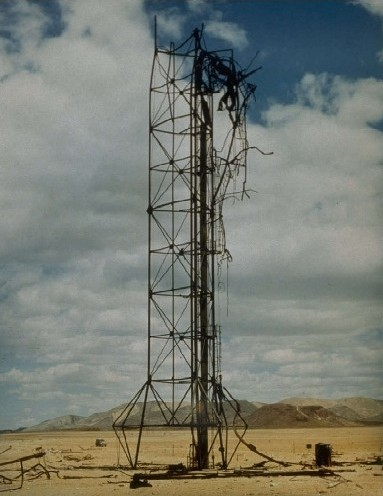
The mangled tower for the Ruth test. The explosion failed to level the testing tower, only somewhat damaging it.

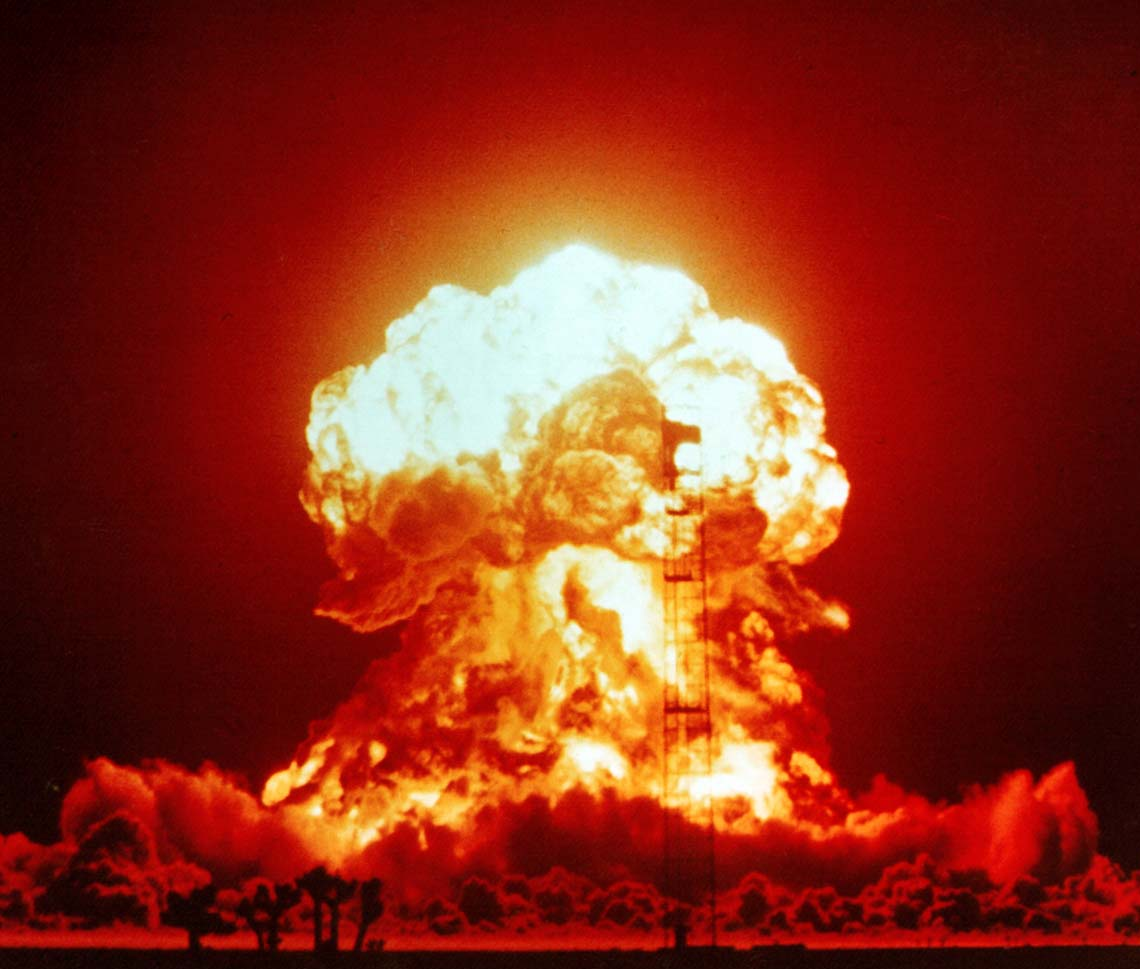
Upshot-Knothole Badger, 23 Kilotons

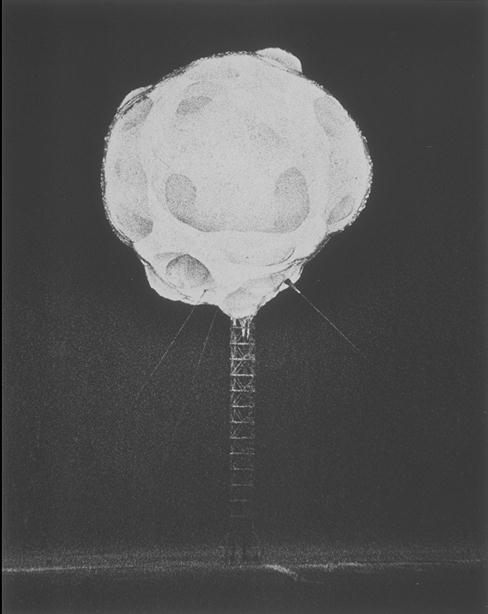
Upshot-Knothole Harry, 32 Kilotons

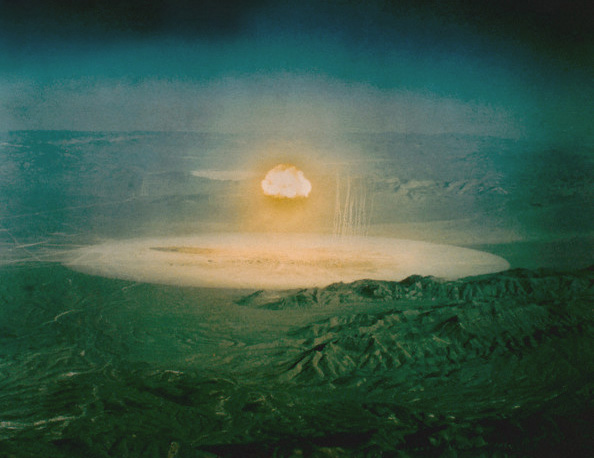
Encore's Mushroom Cloud from far away

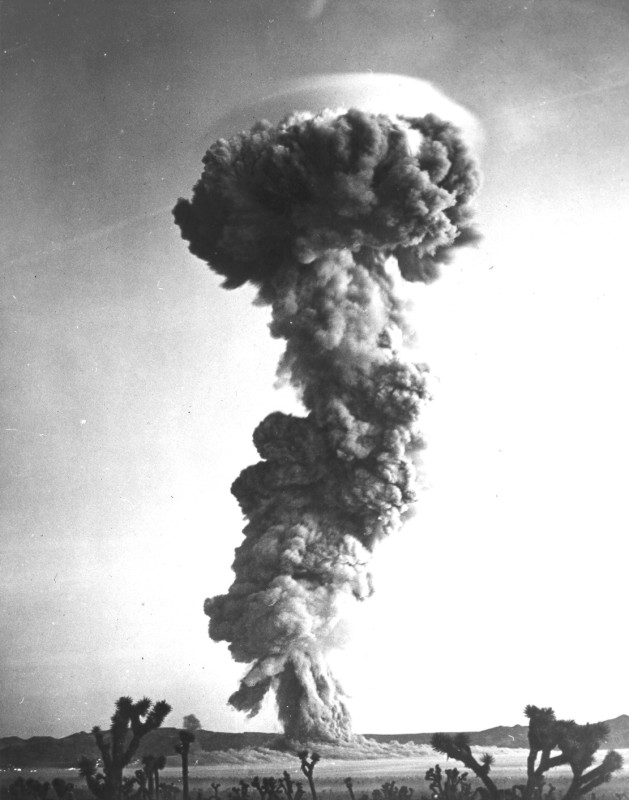
Encore's Mushroom Cloud

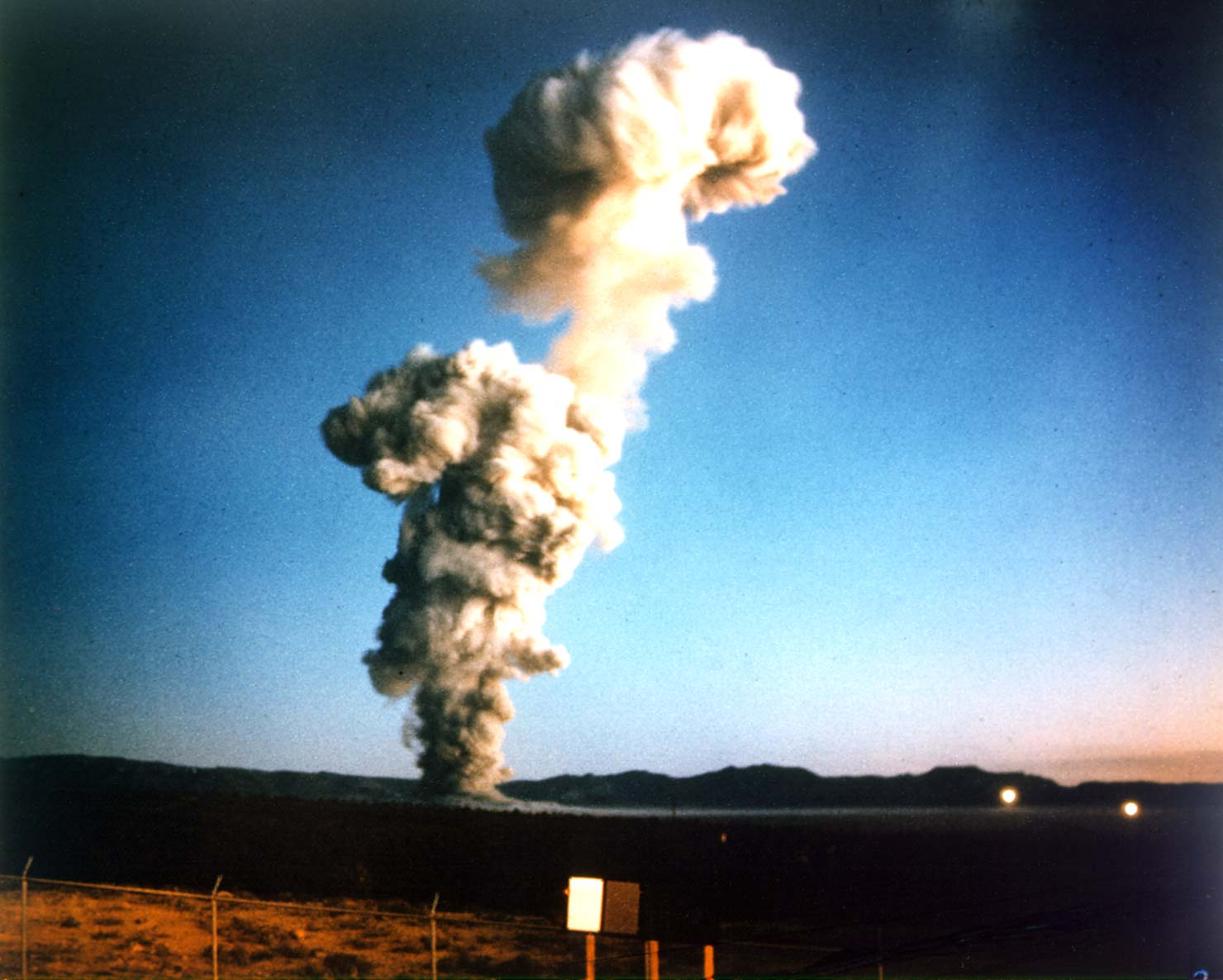
Upshot-Knothole Nancy, 24 Kilotons

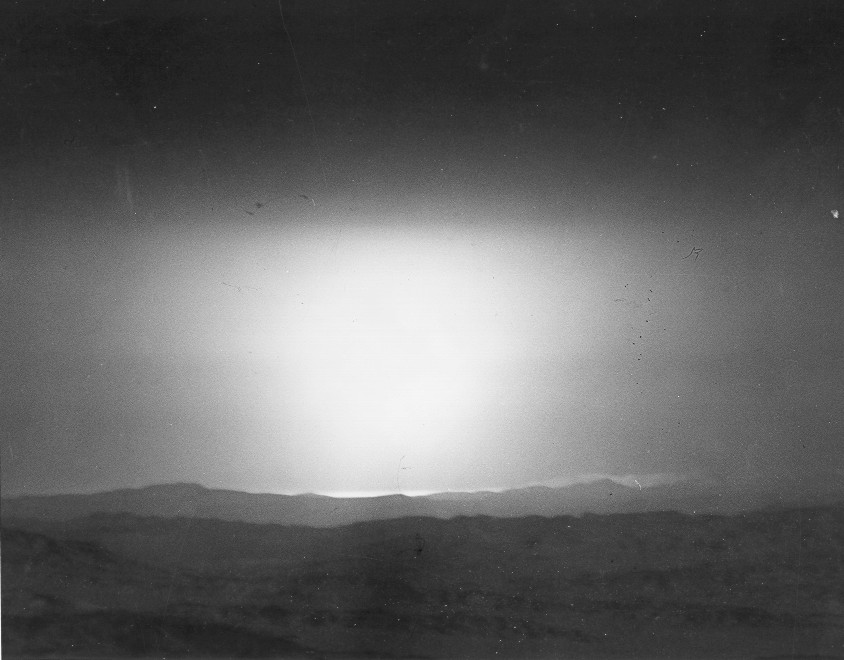
Upshot-Knothole Dixie, 11 Kilotons

Upshot-Knothole Ray, 220 Tons

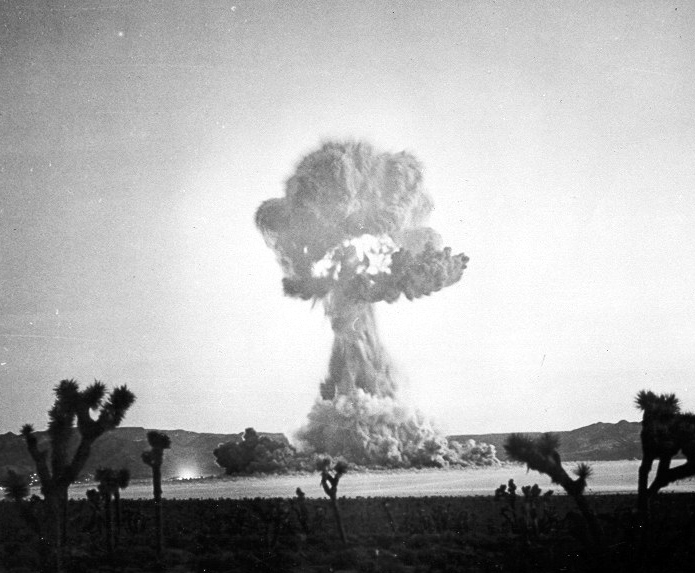
Upshot-Knothole Simon, 43 Kilotons

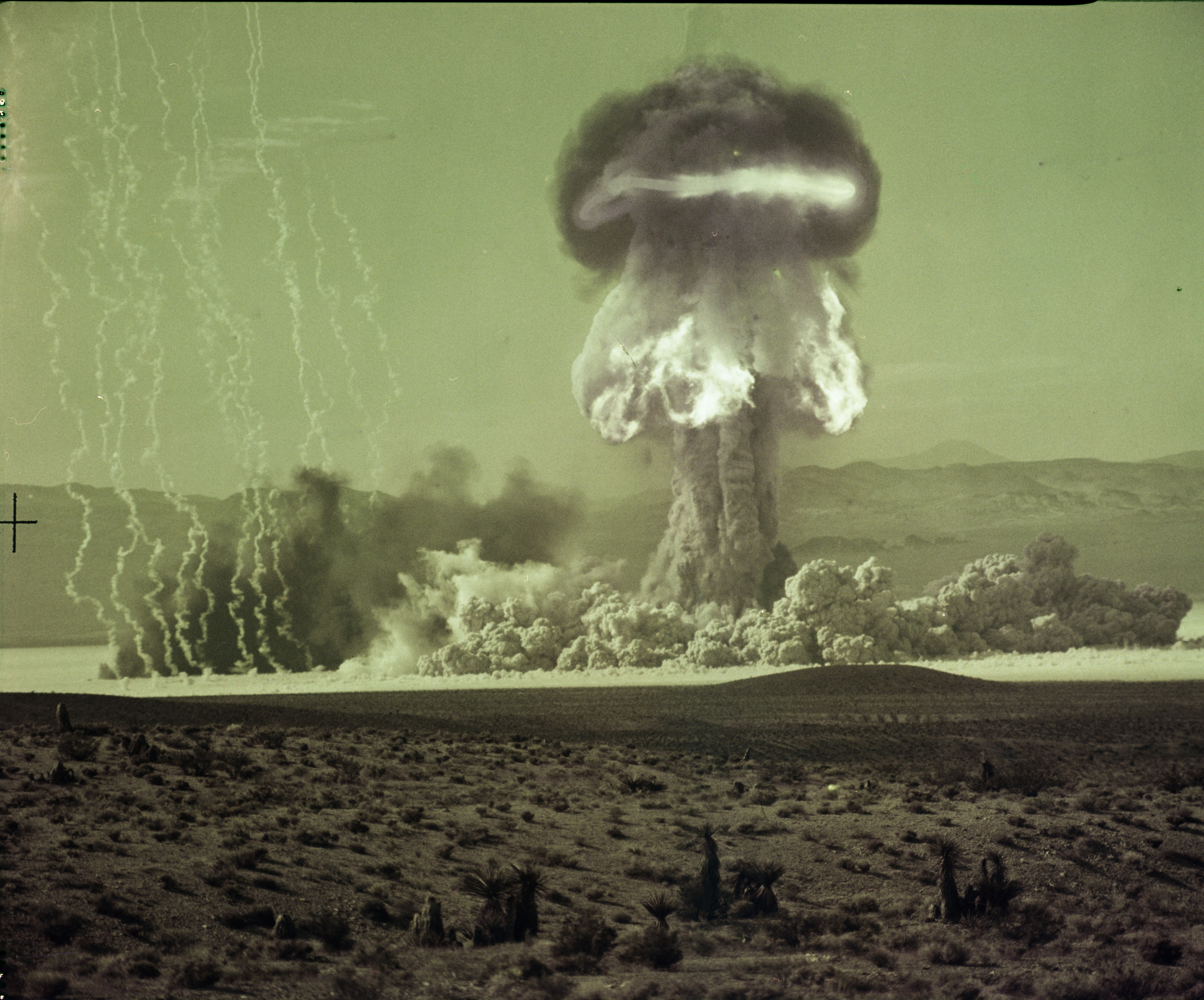
Grable's Mushroom Cloud

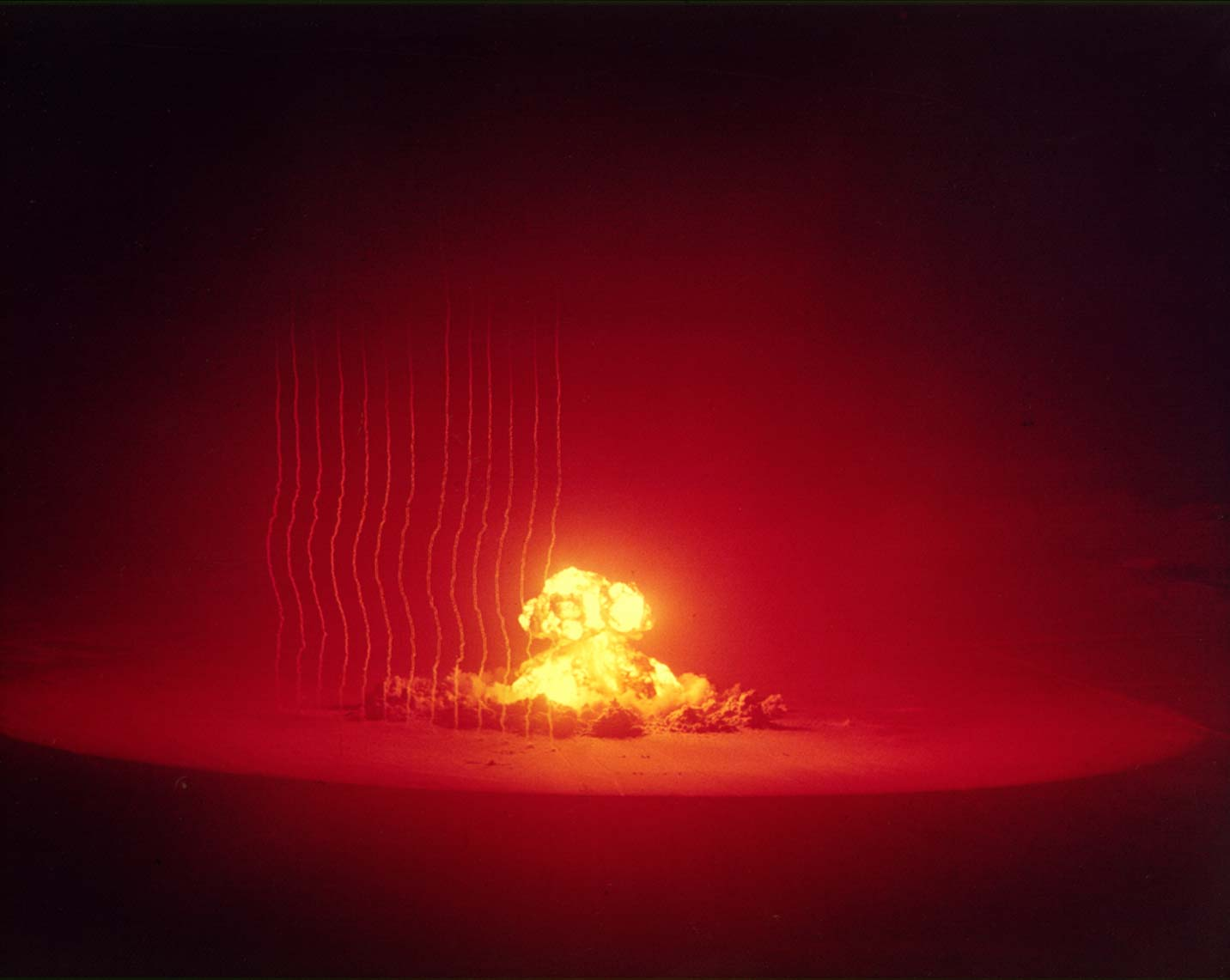
Upshot-Knothole Annie, 16 Kilotons

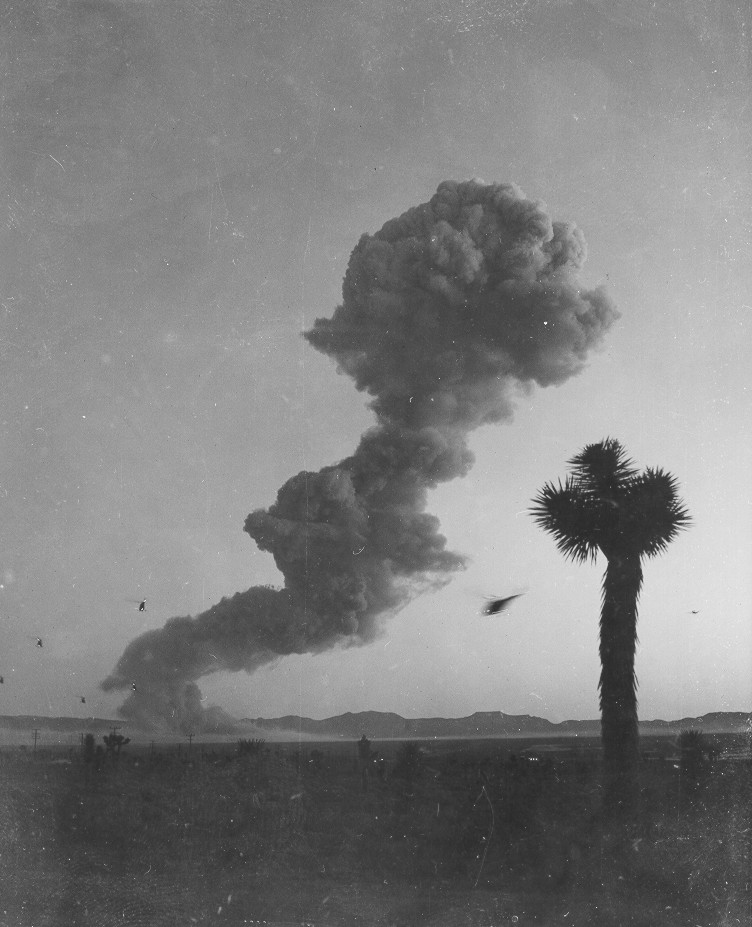
Badger's Mushroom Cloud

== See also ==
- Nuclear artillery
