= High flux reactor =

Type of nuclear research reactor

A high flux reactor is a type of nuclear research reactor designed to produce a high neutron flux for scientific research, isotope production, and materials testing.

== See also ==
- High Flux Isotope Reactor (HFIR), in Oak Ridge, Tennessee, United States of America,
- High Flux Australian Reactor (HIFAR), Australia's first nuclear reactor,
- High-Flux Advanced Neutron Application Reactor (HANARO), in South Korea.
- The High Flux Reactor at Institut Laue–Langevin in France.
- High Flux Reactor (HFR) at Petten in the Netherlands
