= Mark 22 nuclear bomb =

The Mark 22 nuclear bomb (Mk-22) was the first thermonuclear device test by the University of California Radiation Lab (UCRL). The test was part of the Koon shot of Operation Castle. The Mk-22 failed to achieve anything like its intended yield due to premature heating of the secondary from exposure to neutrons. As the other UCRL test planned for the Castle series, the liquid-fueled "Ramrod" device had the same basic design flaw, that test was canceled. Within a month of the bomb's failure, the Mk-22 was terminated because the United States Atomic Energy Commission realized there was nothing that could be done to salvage the design.
