= Upshot-Knothole Simon =

Nuclear weapons test conducted by the United States

Upshot–Knothole Simon
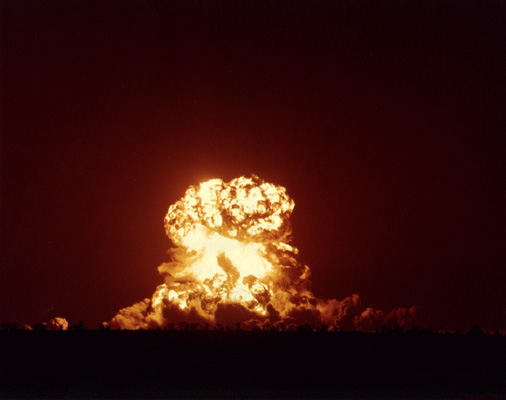

Information
- Country: United States
- Test series: Operation Upshot–Knothole
- Test site: Nevada Test Site
- Date: 25 April 1953
- Test type: Atmospheric
- Yield: 43 kt

Test chronology

Upshot–Knothole Simon was a nuclear detonation conducted as part of the U.S. Operation Upshot–Knothole nuclear testing program. Simon was conducted on 25 April 1953 at the Nevada Test Site, and tested the TX-17/24 thermonuclear weapon design which had a yield of 43 kilotons.

Test: Simon
Time: 12:30 25 April 1953 (GMT)
04:30 25 April 1953 (local)
Location: Nevada Test Site, Area 1
Test height and type: 300 feet (91 m) tower
Yield: 43 kt

The mass of radioactive material in the mushroom cloud did not disperse as expected, but stayed in a small volume of atmosphere as it traveled eastward. Finally, a couple of days later it became entrained in a severe thunderstorm over New York's Capital District, and most of the radioactive material washed out over a fairly small region (Washington and Rensselaer counties). Students in a radiochemistry laboratory at Rensselaer Polytechnic Institute in Troy, New York switched on their geiger counters only to discover radiation levels hundreds of thousands of times higher than normal. Assuming a radioactive spill inside the building, the students were rushed outside to safety – only to discover radiation levels even higher. The professor, Herbert Clark, reported his findings to the Atomic Energy Commission (AEC), who treated it as some sort of joke. Later he was warned to stay silent, lest he lose access to AEC materials, or even face arrest for treason. The information was suppressed for decades until exposed by a local Congressman, Samuel S. Stratton.
