= Uranium(IV) hydride =

Metal hydride composed of uranium and hydrogen

Uranium (IV) hydride
Names
- IUPAC name Uranium (IV) hydride

Identifiers
CAS Number	15457-88-2
3D model (JSmol)	Interactive image
PubChem CID	157485425
CompTox Dashboard (EPA)	DTXSID101336308
- InChI: InChI=1S/U.4H/q+4;4*-1 Key: BWQSNMHQVCNXMP-UHFFFAOYSA-N
- SMILES: [H-].[H-].[H-].[H-].[U+4]

Properties
Chemical formula	UH_{4}
Molar mass	242.061 g·mol^{−1}

Related compounds
Other anions	Uranium(IV) bromide; Uranium(IV) chloride; Uranium(IV) iodide; Uranium(IV) sulfide
- Except where otherwise noted, data are given for materials in their standard state (at 25 °C [77 °F], 100 kPa). Infobox references

Uranium(IV) hydride is a chemical compound of uranium and hydrogen with the chemical formula UH_{4}, a metal hydride.

== Synthesis and Reactions ==
In 1997, Souter et al. reported the production of UH_{4} by reacting laser ablated uranium atoms with dihydrogen and capturing the product on solid argon. The assignment of the structure was made using infrared spectroscopic evidence supported by DFT calculations. Uranium(IV) hydride has a quasi-tetrahedral (C_{s}) structure and is formed by the successive insertion of uranium into two hydrogen molecules:

U + H_{2} → UH_{2}
UH_{2} + H_{2} → UH_{4}

Further reaction with hydrogen only produces dihydrogen complexes: UH_{4}(H_{2})_{n} (1 ≤ n ≤ 6).
