= Mark 5 nuclear bomb =

Nuclear weapon design

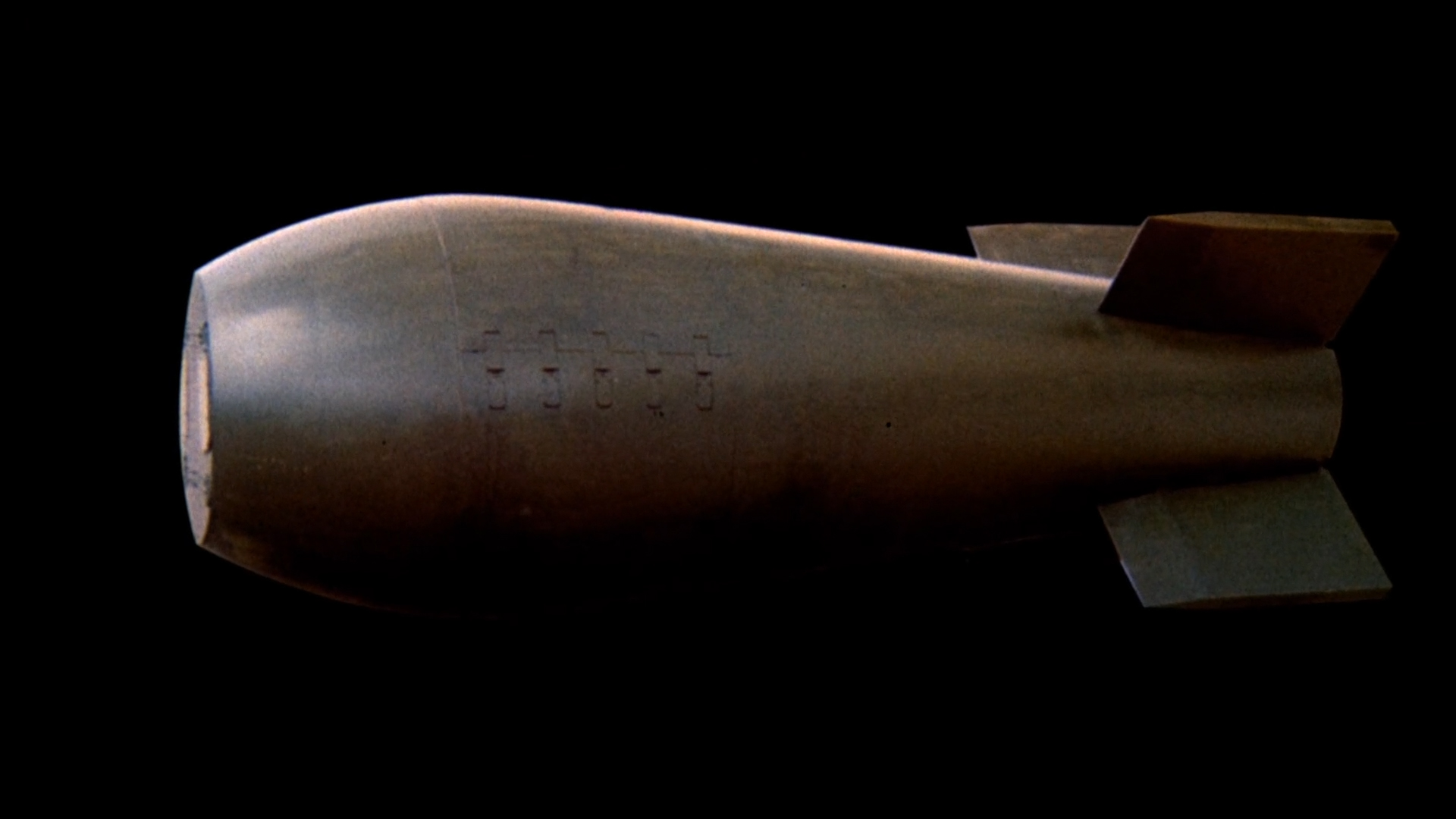
Mark 5 nuclear bomb, side view.

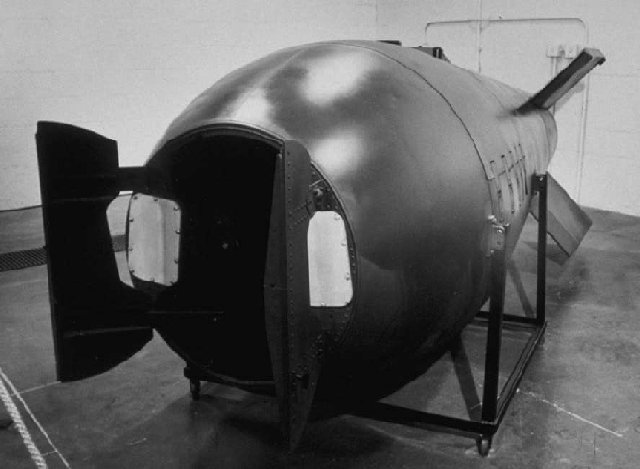
The Mark 5 bomb displaying open doors at front are for insertion of nuclear core

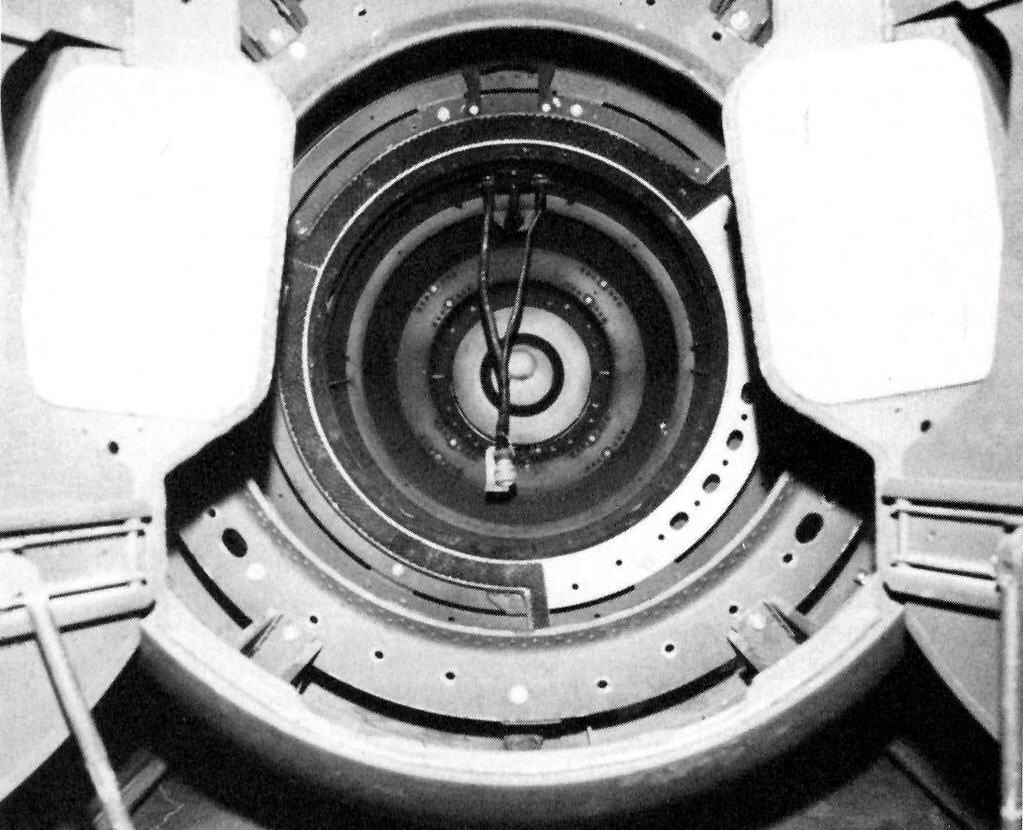
View looking into the nose of a Mark 5, where the fissile pit and final explosive charge segment would be inserted.

The Mark 5 nuclear bomb and W5 nuclear warhead were a common core American nuclear weapon design, designed in the early 1950s and which saw service from 1952 to 1963.

== Description ==
The Mark 5 design was the first production American nuclear weapon which, with a diameter of 39 in (990 mm), was significantly smaller than the 60 in (1,520 mm) diameter implosion system of the 1945 Fat Man nuclear bomb design. The Mark 5 design used a 92-point implosion system and a composite uranium/plutonium fissile material core or pit.

The Mark 5 core and W5 warhead were 39 in (990 mm) in diameter and 76 in (1,930 mm) long; the total Mark 5 bomb had a diameter of 44 in (1,120 mm) and was 129–132 in (3,280–3,350 mm) long. The different versions of Mark 5 weighed 3,025–3,175 lb (1,372–1,440 kg); the W5 versions weighed 2,405–2,650 lb (1,091–1,202 kg).

The Mark 5 and W5 were pure fission weapons. There were at least four basic models of core design used, capable of compatibility with at least eight different core "capsule" designs (which themselves were compatible with many other weapons of the era). Sub-variants with yields of 6, 16, 55, 60, 100, and 120 kilotons have been reported.

As with many early US nuclear weapon designs, the fissile material or pit could be kept separately from the bomb and assembled into it during flight. This technology is known as In Flight Insertion (IFI). The Mark 5 had an automatic IFI mechanism which could insert the pit into the center of the explosive assembly from a storage position in the bomb nose.

== History ==
The Mark 5 was in service from 1952 to 1963. The W5 saw service from 1954 to 1963. Approximately 72 Mark 5 weapons were supplied for delivery by Royal Air Force bombers but under US control, under the auspices of Project E.

A Mark 5 was used as the primary fission trigger used in Ivy Mike, the first thermonuclear device in history.

A total of 140 Mark-5 bombs were produced.

== Survivors ==
there are a number of mark 5 casings on display to the public.

- National Museum of Nuclear Science & History in Albuquerque, New Mexico
- National Museum of the United States Air Force in Dayton, Ohio

== See also ==
- List of nuclear weapons
- Nuclear weapon design

== Bibliography ==
- Leitch, Andy. "V-Force Arsenal: Weapons for the Valiant, Victor and Vulcan". Air Enthusiast No. 107, September/October 2003. pp. 52–59. ISSN 0143-5450
