= Castle Koon =

1954 nuclear weapon test

Information
- Country: United States
- Test series: Operation Castle
- Test site: Bikini Atoll
- Date: 7 April 1954; 72 years ago
- Test type: Atmospheric
- Yield: 110 kt

Test chronology

The Koon shot of Operation Castle was a test of a thermonuclear device designed at the University of California Radiation Laboratory (UCRL), now Lawrence Livermore National Laboratory.

The "dry" two-stage device was known as "Morgenstern" and had a highly innovative secondary stage. It was tested on 7 April 1954. The predicted yield was between 0.33 and 3.5 megatons, with an expected yield of 1 megaton. The actual yield was 0.11 megatons. Morgenstern was thus a fizzle.

Post-shot analysis showed that the failure was caused by the premature heating of the secondary by the neutron flux of the primary. This was a simple design defect and not related to the unique geometry of the secondary. The UCRL's other shot, the "wet" (i.e., cryogenic) ramrod device, originally scheduled for the Echo shot, was cancelled because it shared the same design defect and because the "dry" design tested as the Bravo shot rendered "wet" designs obsolete.

The name "Morgenstern" (German for morning star) was chosen because of the shape of the secondary. The secondary consisted of a central sphere from which spikes were radiating, resembling a morning star / mace. The spikes may have been an idea from physicist Edward Teller and colleagues to use implosive jets to compress the thermonuclear core. It was more than two decades before weapons were designed that utilized a secondary concept similar to that first tested in the Koon shot.
