= Robin (nuclear primary) =

Common design nuclear fission bomb core

The Robin nuclear primary was the common design nuclear fission bomb core for several Cold War designs for American nuclear and thermonuclear weapons, according to researcher Chuck Hansen. Primary is the technical term for the fission bomb component of a thermonuclear or fusion bomb, which is used to start the reactions going and implode and detonate the second, fusion stage. The Robin design was used as the W45 nuclear warhead, and as the primary (stage) in the W38 and W47 thermonuclear weapons.

It has been associated with the W48 nuclear warhead, but this is probably an error.

== History ==
The Robin is apparently a weaponized version of the Swan primary tested during Operation Redwing and shares its design features.

== See also ==
- List of nuclear weapons
- Teller-Ulam design
- Python primary
- Tsetse primary
