= W45 (nuclear warhead) =

American nuclear warhead

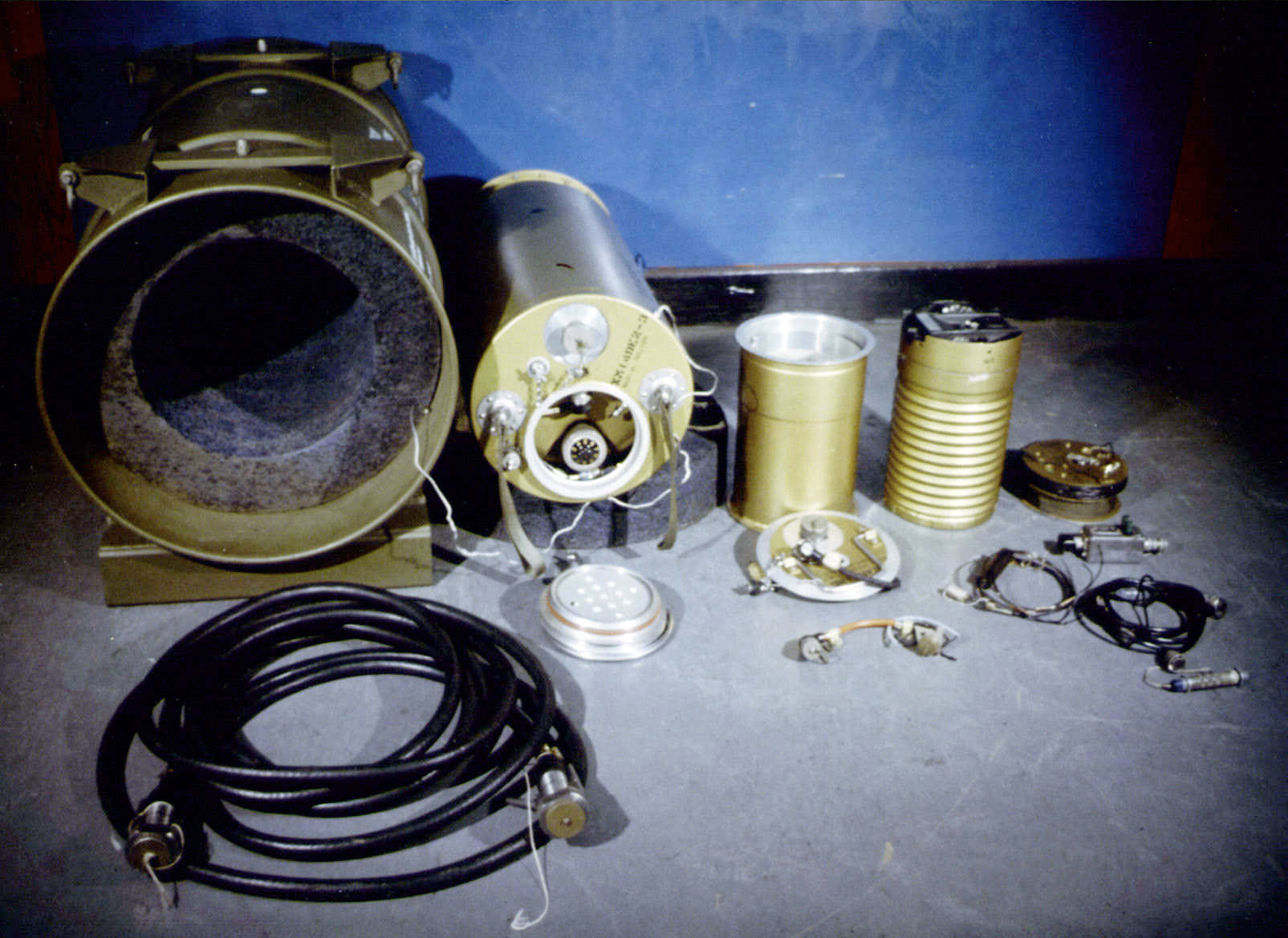
Internal components of the Medium Atomic Demolition Munition setup. W45 warhead is to the right of the casing.

The W45 was a multipurpose American nuclear warhead developed in the early 1960s, first built in 1962 and fielded in some applications until 1988. It had a diameter of 11.5 inches (290 mm), a length of 27 inches (690 mm) and weighed 150 pounds (68 kg). The yields of different W45 versions were 0.5, 1, 5, 8, 10, and 15 kilotons. The W45 was designed at the Livermore branch of the University of California Radiation Laboratory (UCRL), now Lawrence Livermore National Laboratory (LLNL). It was developed in part during 1958-1961.

W45 used a common nuclear fission core called the Robin primary, which was used as the fission primary in the thermonuclear W38 and W47 weapons. In January 1960, the MADM version of the W45 was assigned the name W45 Mod 1. This version of the warhead was only different from the W45 Mod 0 used in Little John and Terrier in that it had no environmental sensing device, the ADM role having precluded the possibility of such a device. Instead, the warhead received a three-digit combination padlock to restrict access to the device.

Among six of the 16 LLNL-developed warhead designs that entered the US nuclear weapon stockpile beginning in 1958, the W45 entered the stockpile in 1962, around the time of the Nuclear Test Ban Treaty signing in 1963. The W45 was one of three designs that needed revision following testing after finding problems, for the W45 this was due to radioactive aging reducing the yield to roughly one half of the original design, and refitting a modified chemical explosive.

Applications of the W45 warhead included:

- Little John SSM
- Terrier SAM
- Medium Atomic Demolition Munition or MADM
- Bullpup ASM

== See also ==
- List of nuclear weapons
- Robin primary

== Bibliography ==
- History of the Mark 45 Warhead (Report). Sandia National Labs. SC-M-67-677. Archived from the original on 2021-08-31.
