= Medium Atomic Demolition Munition =

American tactical nuclear weapon

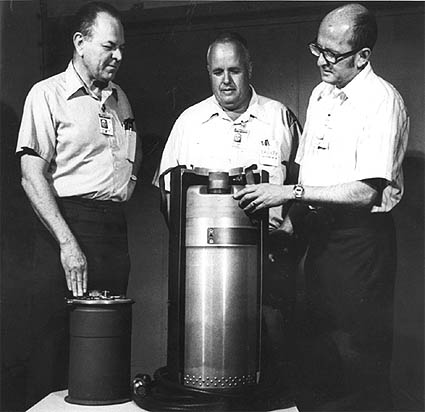
Scientists look at a Medium Atomic Demolition Munition. Cutaway casing with warhead inside, code-decoder / firing unit is at left.

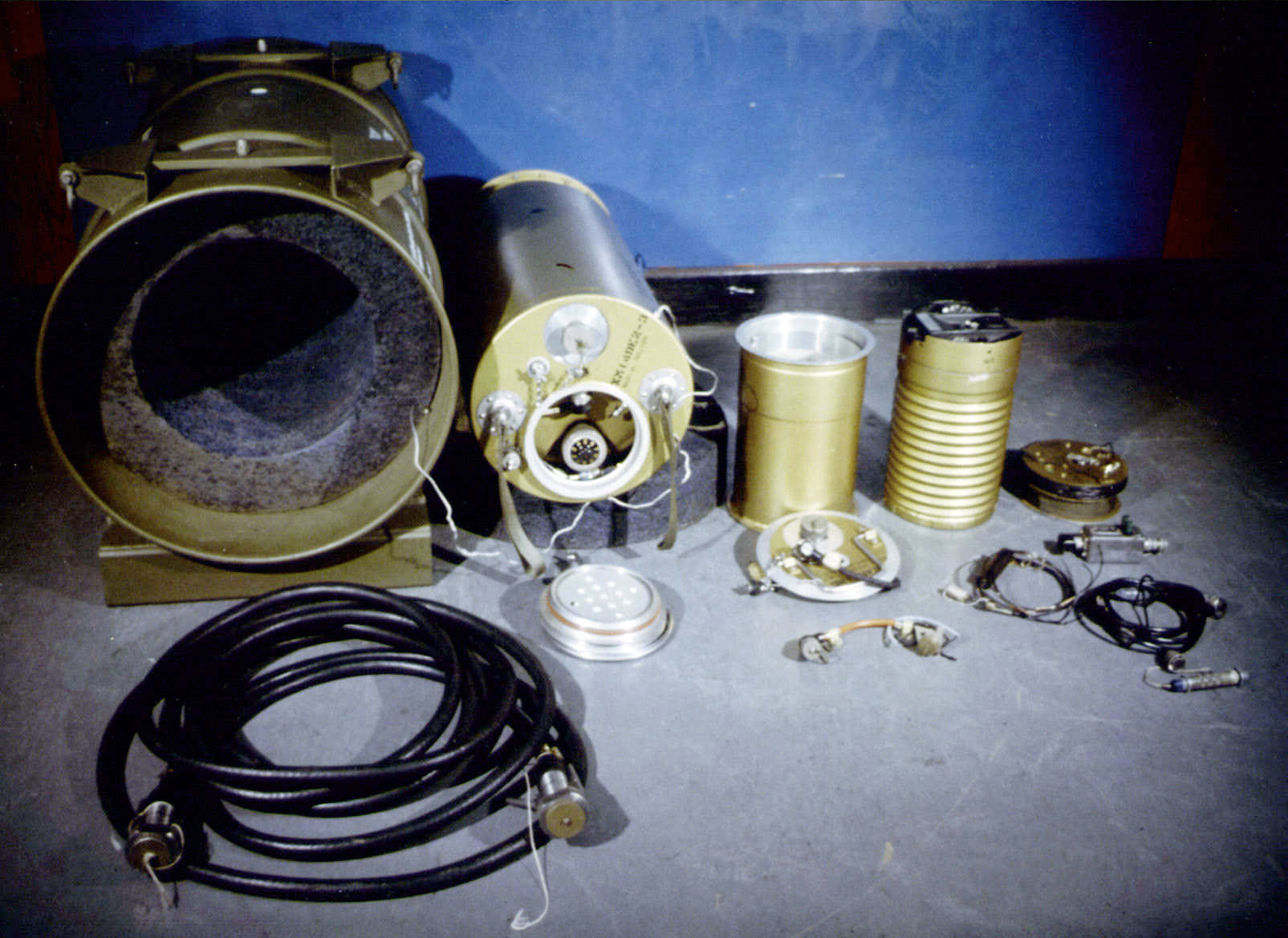
Internal components of the MADM setup. From left to right: packing container, W45 warhead, code-decoder unit, firing unit.

Medium Atomic Demolition Munition (MADM) was a tactical nuclear weapon developed by the United States during the Cold War. It was an atomic demolition munition (ADM), a combat engineering device for demolition of structures and for battlefield shaping. The device contained a W45 warhead with an estimated yield of 0.5 to 15 kilotonnes of TNT (2.1 to 62.8 TJ). Each MADM weighed 391 pounds (177 kg) in its transportation container. They were deployed between 1962 and 1986.

In service, the MADM was known as the M167, M172 and M175 Atomic Demolition Charges (ADCs).

== History ==
The history of the MADM began in 1954 with the proposal for a light-weight multi-purpose warhead. Its predecessor, the first atomic demolition munition (ADM), was deployed in the same year. This was a low-yield weapon (0.5 to 15 kilotonnes of TNT (2.1 to 63 TJ)) used by special forces and commando teams to destroy enemy infrastructure such as bridges tunnels, and harbors, among others. The MADM warhead was designed to be economical in nuclear material, having a diameter of less than 15 inches (380 mm), and it was hoped that the device could be broken down into sub-40-pound (18 kg) components for carriage and assembly in the field.

The program languished for several years, with Los Alamos and Sandia in a joint letter suggesting that warheads in the range of 12 to 18 inches (300 to 460 mm) were possible. At one point, the W25 warhead for the AIR-2 Genie missile was considered for the application. The program for the W45 was authorized in January 1956. In addition to MADM, the program was to develop warheads for Nike I, Little John, Terrier and ASROC.

Possible devices for the program were tested in Operations Redwing and Plumbbob. In August 1956, it was decided that the ASROC warhead would be assigned to LASL as the XW-44, while the other warheads including MADM would be given to the University of California Radiation Laboratory (UCRL) (now Lawrence Livermore National Laboratory) with the designation XW-45.

In February 1957, it was believed that the weapon could be design released by mid-1958 with production beginning a year later. In March 1957, it was suggested that the W44 and W45 programs be consolidated. This proposal was later abandoned. At this point, it was believed the design would have a maximum diameter of 11.75 inches (298 mm), a length of 27 inches (690 mm), and a weight of 150 pounds (68 kg). Major components of the weapon were sourced from other weapon systems.

In September 1957, the warhead operational availability date was delayed by 14 months. In February 1958, for still-classified reasons, the weapon received a significant redesign and a new developmental name: XW-45-X1. This, however, increased the weapon diameter to 12.75 inches (324 mm) and made the warhead incompatible with Little John without substantial redesign. In the interest of economics and stockpile simplification, it was decided to revert to the original XW-45 design in February 1959.

In January 1960, the MADM version of the W45 was assigned the name W45 Mod 1. This version of the warhead was only different from the W45 Mod 0 used in Little John and Terrier in that it had no environmental sensing device, the ADM role having precluded the possibility of such a device. Instead, the warhead received a three-digit combination padlock to restrict access to the device. War reserve production was achieved in April 1962.

In October 1963, the army informed the Atomic Energy Commission that the usefulness of the weapon was limited by the inability to emplace the weapon underwater or in backfilled holes. Sandia and Livermore replied in December 1963, proposing a watertight case for the weapon featuring waterproof cables and connectors. A prototype was demonstrated in January 1963 and production of the case was authorized the following month.

At about the same time, it was proposed that the weapon be fitted with a Permissive Action Link (PAL), consisting of a five-digit coded switch. This was accepted and implemented on the subsequent W45 Mod 2. When the Mod 2 weapon was incorporated into its new protective case, the weapon became the W45 Mod 3. Early production of the Mod 3 began in July 1965.

The MADM was retired in 1984.

== Design ==
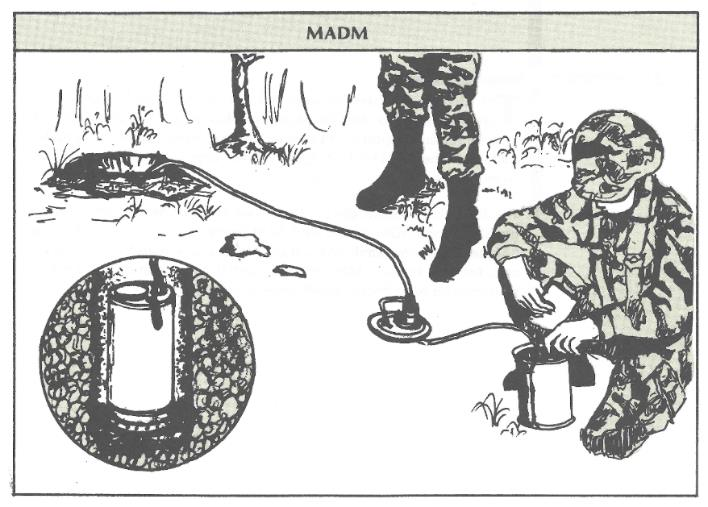
Diagram showing underground emplacement of the Medium Atomic Demolition Munition

The weapon was a boosted, externally-initiated device. It was allegedly a Swan-type weapon utilizing an air-lens. The yield was reportedly 0.5 to 15 kilotonnes of TNT (2.1 to 63 TJ).

The weapon was designed so it could be detonated by a timer of up to 21 days, by radio or by field wire, and featured a waterproof protective case.

In its waterproof case, the weapon was 42 inches (1.1 m) long, 24 inches (0.61 m) wide, 28 inches (0.71 m) high and weighed 391 pounds (177 kg).

== MADM use ==
=== Offensive use ===
ADM employment manuals describe the use of ADMs tactically in both offensive and defensive operations.

In offensive operations, ADMs are described as being useful for improving flank and rear security of a unit, impeding counterattacks, and assisting in enemy entrapment.

=== Engineering and defensive use ===
ADM employment manuals describe the use of ADMs defensively for combat engineering purposes. Possible targets described include bridges, dams, canals, tunnels, airfields, railroad marshaling yards, ports and industrial plants, and power facilities.

Extensive tables were provided to enable the selection of the correct yield for each particular target. These tables accounted for various employment particulars such as depth of burial, fallout considerations, and minimum safe separation distances between adjacent weapons and personnel.

== See also ==
- Special Atomic Demolition Munition
