= Explosive lens =

Shaped charge used in nuclear weapons

In an implosion-type nuclear weapon, polygonal lenses are arranged around the spherical core of the bomb. Thirty-two "points" are shown. Other designs use as many as 96 or as few as two such points.

An explosive lens—as used, for example, in nuclear weapons—is a highly specialized shaped charge. In general, it is a device composed of several explosive charges. These charges are arranged and formed with the intent to control the shape of the detonation wave passing through them. The explosive lens is conceptually similar to an optical lens, which focuses light waves. The charges that make up the explosive lens are chosen to have different rates of detonation. In order to convert a spherically expanding wavefront into a spherically converging one using only a single boundary between the constituent explosives, the boundary shape must be a hyperboloid; similarly, to convert a spherically diverging front into a flat one, the boundary shape must be a paraboloid, and so on. Several boundaries can be used to reduce aberrations (deviations from intended shape) of the final wavefront.

== Invention ==
During the Manhattan Project, James L. Tuck suggested using explosive lenses to achieve a more uniform implosion for the atomic bomb. Tuck, Seth Neddermeyer, and John von Neumann are credited with inventing the explosive lens method used in the first implosion-type nuclear weapons.

== Use in nuclear weapons ==
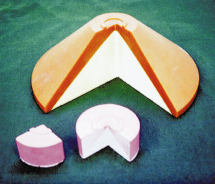
A type of modern high explosive lenses without wave shaper. The colored areas are the fast explosive, while the white areas are the slow explosives.

In a nuclear weapon, an array of explosive lenses is used to change the several approximately spherical diverging detonation waves into a single spherical converging one. The converging wave is then used to collapse the various shells (tamper, reflector, pusher, etc.) and finally compresses the core (pit) of fissionable material to a prompt critical state. They are usually machined from a plastic bonded explosive and an inert insert, called a wave-shaper, which is often a dense foam or plastic, though many other materials can be used. Other, mainly older explosive lenses do not include a wave shaper, but employ two explosive types that have significantly different velocities of detonation (VoD), which are in the range from 5 to 9 km/s. The use of the low- and high-speed explosives again results in a spherical converging detonation wave to compress the physics package. The original Gadget device used in the Trinity test and Fat Man dropped on Nagasaki used Baratol as the low-VoD explosive and Composition B as the fast, but other combinations can be used.

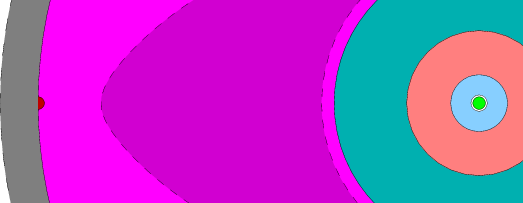
Cross-section of the "Trinity" gadget. The red dot to the left is the detonator, the alternating high (in light purple) and slow explosives (dark purple) are the explosive lens which forces the spherical core to compress into prompt criticality.

The illustration to the left represents a cross section through a segment of a polygonal wedge. The wedges are fitted together to form a spherical device. The exploding-bridgewire detonator at the far left triggers a semi-spherical detonation wave through the high-speed outer explosive. (It is semi-spherical because the exploding-bridgewire acts as a point-detonator.) As the wave is transferred to the precisely shaped inner explosive, a new spherical wave—centered on the object—is formed. The successful functioning of this device hinges on the simultaneous initiation of the wave in each segment, uniformity and precision in the speed of the wave, and correctness and accuracy in the shape of the interface between the two explosives.

A series of experiments were performed in 1944 and 1945 during the Manhattan Project to develop the lenses for a satisfactory implosion. One of the most important tests was the series of RaLa Experiments.

Initially, a 32 "point" assembly was used (each of which had a pair of exploding-bridgewire detonators).

Later, a 92 "point" assembly was tried, with the objective of obtaining a smaller assembly with improved performance.

Finally, with the success of the Swan test nuclear explosive device, a two "point" assembly became feasible. Swan used an "air lens" system in addition to shaped charges and became the basis of all U.S. successor designs, nuclear and thermonuclear alike, and featured small size, light weight, and exceptional reliability and safety, as well as using the least amount of strategic material of any design.

== Other uses ==
Lenses using alternate design techniques and producing flat "plane wave" outputs are used for high transient pressure physics and materials science experiments.

== See also ==
- Impact depth
- Nuclear weapon design
