= MGR-3 Little John =

Artillery rocket

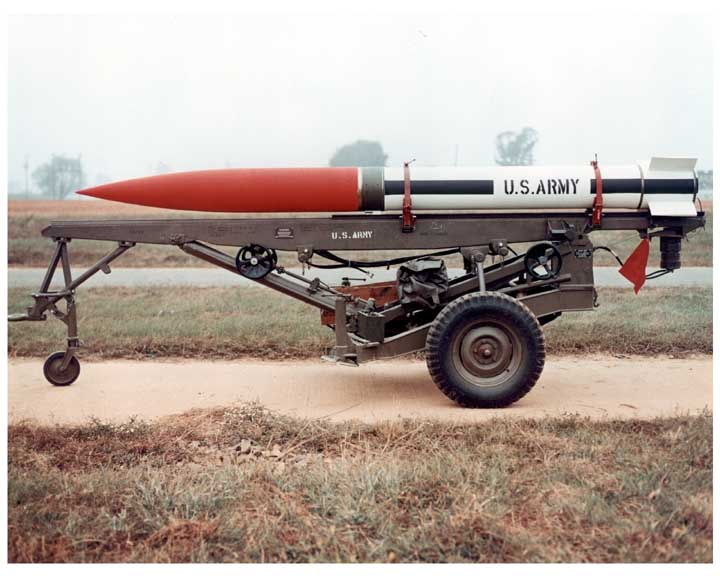
- XM51 production rocket, with small fins and short, lightweight XM34 launcher
- Type: Rocket artillery
- Place of origin: United States

Service history
- In service: 1961–1967
- Used by: United States
- Wars: Cold War

Production history
- Designer: Army Ballistic Missile Agency
- Designed: 1955
- Manufacturer: Douglas Aircraft Company
- No. built: 500

Specifications
- Mass: 2,010 lb (910 kg)
- Length: 14 ft 5 in (4.4 m)
- Diameter: 320 mm (13 in)
- Maximum firing range: 10 nautical miles (19 km)
- Propellant: Solid rocket fuel

The MGR-3 Little John was a free flight artillery rocket system designed and put into service by the U.S. Army during the 1950s and 1960s.

== Description ==
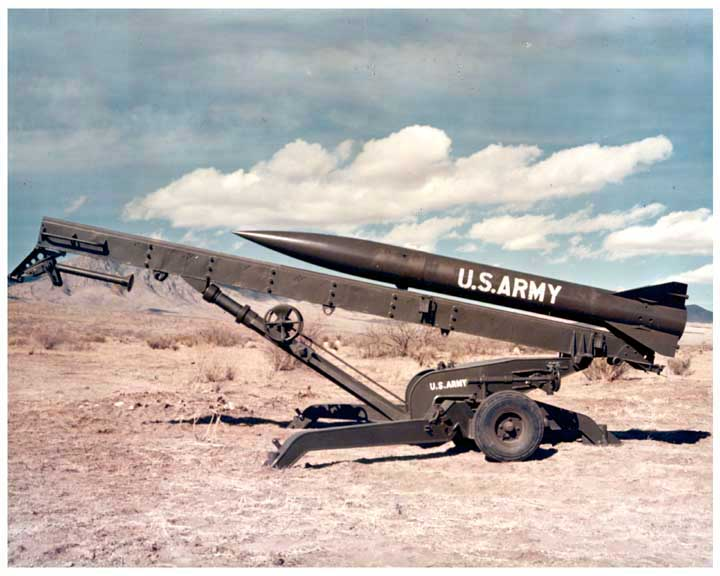
The XM47 (large fins) was only an interim rocket, essentially a rocket test vehicle, and was used for training and testing purposes only.

Carried on the XM34 rocket launcher, it could carry either nuclear or conventional warheads. It was primarily intended for use in airborne assault operations and to complement the heavier, self-propelled MGR-1 Honest John rocket. Development of the rocket was started at Army's Rocket and Guided Missile Agency laboratory at Huntsville, Alabama, the Redstone Arsenal, in June 1955.

In June 1956, the first launch of the XM47 Little John occurred. This initial model was spin-stabilised by larger triangular fins and a longer launch rail. It was stabilised by the fins alone until it began to spin. The production XM51 version had smaller rectangular fins, too small to stabilise the rocket, and was stabilised from launch by a unique "spin-on-straight-rail" system.

The XM51 Little John was delivered to the field in November 1961 and remained in the regular Army's weapons inventory until August 1969.

It was a spin-stabilized field artillery rocket that followed a ballistic trajectory to ground targets. The rocket XM51 consisted of a warhead, a rocket motor assembly, and an igniter assembly. The components were shipped in separate containers, with the warhead and motor assembled before issue and the igniter inserted immediately before use.

DoD video showing MGR-3 Little John in army-testing in 1957, including transport by CH-37 helicopter.

The Little John differs from the Honest John in not only its size but how it is stabilized in flight. The flight of the Honest John is stabilized by a spin that is imparted to the rocket by spin rockets after the round leaves the launcher. The XM51 Little John rocket flight is stabilized by applying spin to the rocket while on the launcher, just before firing. This manual method of stabilization was called "spin-on-straight-rail" (SOSR). A hand-wound mechanical clock spring on the launcher rotates the rocket through gears, when the firing lanyard is pulled. Once the rocket is rotating at 3 1/2 rev. per second, inertial switches connect the thermal batteries to the rocket motor's igniter. In flight, the spin is maintained by canted fins. The system was manufactured by the Douglas Aircraft Company.

"Weapons of the Field Artillery" (1966).

The rocket and launcher system were light enough to be easily transported by helicopters and other aircraft or towed by a vehicle. The Phase II Little John weapon system was initially deployed with the 1st Missile Battalion, 57th Field Artillery in Okinawa, Japan.

The rocket was retired beginning in July, 1967, with the final rocket removed from inventory in 1970. Five hundred rockets were produced during the life of the weapon program.

== Operators ==
United States: Used by the United States Army until 1967.

== Specifications ==
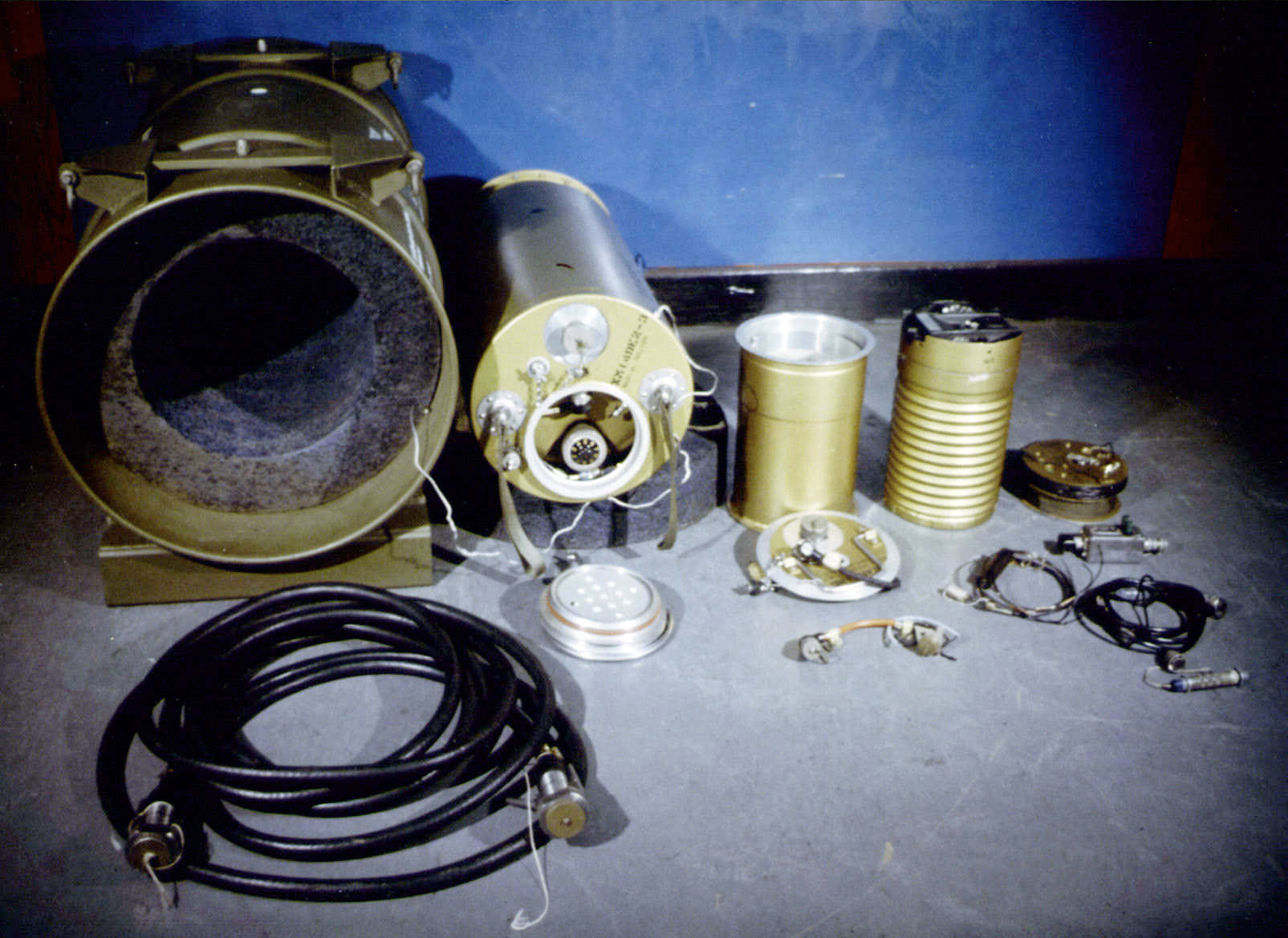
Internal components of the Medium Atomic Demolition Munition. W45 warhead is to the right of the casing.

- Length: 4.4 metres (14.5 ft)
- Diameter: 320 millimetres (12.5 in)
- Rocket weight: 350 kilograms (780 lb)
- Combined weight of rocket and launcher: 910 kilograms (2,000 lb)
- Warhead: W45 with a yield of 1–10 kilotons of TNT (4.2–41.8 TJ).
- Propellant: solid rocket fuel
- Maximum range: 19 kilometres (10 nmi)
