= Swan (nuclear primary) =

American nuclear warhead primary

Swan was a United States test nuclear explosive, which was developed into the XW-45 warhead. The Swan device is the first design to incorporate a two-point ignition hollow-pit air-lens implosion assembly together with fusion boosting.

It was tested standalone on June 22, 1956, in shot Redwing Inca. It was tested again as the primary of a thermonuclear device on July 2, 1956, in shot Redwing Mohawk. Both tests were successful.

== Design features ==
The Swan device had a yield of 15 kilotons, weighed 105 pounds (48 kg), and had a (symmetrical) ovoidshape with a diameter of 11.6 inches (29 cm) and a length of 22.8 inches (58 cm), a length to diameter ratio of 1.97.

The above schematicillustrates what were probably its essential features.
