= W38 (nuclear warhead) =

American thermonuclear warhead

- Type: Nuclear warhead

Service history
- In service: May 1961 - May 1965
- Used by: United States

Production history
- Designer: Lawrence Livermore National Laboratory
- Designed: 1956 to 1961
- No. built: 180

Specifications
- Mass: 3,080 pounds (1,400 kg)
- Length: 82 inches (2,100 mm) (127 inches (3,200 mm) in RV)
- Diameter: 32 inches (810 mm)
- Detonation mechanism: Contact, airburst
- Blast yield: 3.75 megatonnes of TNT (15.7 PJ)

The W38 was an American thermonuclear warhead used in the early to mid-1960s as a warhead for Atlas E and F, and LGM-25 Titan I ICBMs. It was first built in 1961 and was in service from 1961 to 1965. 70 were deployed on Titan I missiles and 110 on Atlas missiles. It used the Avco Mark 4 reentry vehicle.

== Statistics ==
The W38 was 32 inches (81 cm) in diameter and 82.5 inches (2 m) long. It weighed 3,080 pounds (1,400 kg) and had a design yield of 3.75 megatons with an airburst or contact fuze.

== Origins ==
The W38 was the first thermonuclear ICBM warhead developed by the University of California Radiation Laboratory (UCRL), which was renamed the Lawrence Livermore National Laboratory in 1981.

== Successor Systems ==
The W38 was superseded by the Titan II missile family with a W53 warhead and 9 megaton payload.

== See also ==
- List of nuclear weapons
