= Cecil Thomas Weir =

Royal Air Force officer (1913–1965)

Cecil Thomas (Ginger) Weir
- Born: 2 April 1913; Glasgow, Scotland
- Died: 5 August 1965 (aged 52) Washington, D.C., United States
- Allegiance: United Kingdom
- Branch: Royal Air Force
- Service years: 1933–1965
- Rank: Air Vice-Marshal
- Service number: 33075
- Commands: Joint Warfare Establishment; School of Land/Air Warfare; No. 61 Squadron RAF
- Conflicts: World War II
- Awards: Companion of the Order of the Bath; Commander of the Order of the British Empire; Distinguished Flying Cross; King's Commendation for Valuable Service in the Air; Mentioned in Despatches (2)

Air Vice-Marshal Cecil Thomas (Ginger) Weir, CB, CBE, DFC (2 April 1913 – 5 August 1965) was an officer in the Royal Air Force. During the Second World War he served in RAF Bomber Command. He was taken prisoner after his aircraft was hit by a bomb from another aircraft during a raid on the Osnabruck Canal in November 1944 and was imprisoned in Stalag Luft I. He was in charge of the Operation Buffalo British nuclear tests at Maralinga in Australia in 1956, and air task group commander for the Operation Grapple nuclear tests at Christmas Island in 1957. In 1963 he became the first commandant of the Joint Warfare Establishment.

== Early life ==
Cecil Thomas (Ginger) Weir was born in Glasgow, Scotland, on 2 April 1913. He was educated at Brentwood College School on Vancouver Island in British Columbia, Canada. He entered the Royal Air Force College Cranwell in 1931, and graduated and was commissioned as a pilot officer on 15 July 1933.

Weir was initially posted to No. 25 Squadron RAF. On 8 October 1934, he joined No. 824 Squadron, Fleet Air Arm, then serving with the China Station. He returned to the UK in 1937, and attended the Armament Officers Course at the Air Armament School. He was promoted to flying officer on 15 January 1935, and flight lieutenant on 15 January 1937, and squadron leader on 1 June 1939.

== Second World War ==
During early part of the Second World War, he served as an instructor at No. 4 Bombing and Gunnery School RAF at RAF West Freugh and No. 2 Air Armament School RAF. He was promoted to the temporary rank of wing commander on 1 June 1941. He commanded No. 61 Squadron RAF from September 1941 to June 1942, and was mentioned in despatches on 24 September 1941, and 11 June 1942. He then became an instructor again, serving in the UK. Canada and the United States.

Weir assumed command of RAF Fiskerton on 7 July 1944, and then RAF Fulbeck on 10 October 1944. During a raid on the Osnabruck Canal in November 1944, his Avro Lancaster bomber was hit by a bomb from another aircraft. The sole survivor of the crew, he became a prisoner of war, in Stalag Luft I. Released when the war ended, he was awarded the Distinguished Flying Cross on 3 April 1945, with the award backdated to 20 November 1944. He was promoted to the wartime substantive rank of wing commander on 7 January 1945, and substantive rank on 1 October 1946.

== Post-war ==
After receiving a King's Commendation for Valuable Service in the Air on 9 June 1949, Weir served as Senior Officer-in-Charge Administration (SOA) at AHQ Malta from 3 Dec 1949, with promotion to group captain on 1 January 1951. He worked in the Air Ministry from 1952 to 1955, when he became commander of the Central Gunnery School at RAF Leconfield. He was task force commander for the Operation Buffalo British nuclear tests at Maralinga in Australia in 1956, which saw the first air drop of a live British nuclear weapon. After promotion to air commodore on 1 January 1957, he was air task group commander for the Operation Grapple nuclear tests at Christmas Island in 1957, the first test of a British thermonuclear weapon, for which he was made a Commander of the Order of the British Empire in the 1958 New Year Honours,

Afterwards, Weir attended the Joint Services Staff College. He became the Senior Air Staff Officer (SASO) at HQ Middle East Air Force on 12 May 1958, and became Deputy Commander in Chief of the Middle East Air Force on 23 April 1959. He was promoted to air vice-marshal on 1 July 1959. and was made a Companion of the Order of the Bath on 9 February 1960. On 15 May 1961, he became commandant of the School of Land/Air Warfare; on 31 March 1963 the school was absorbed into the Joint Warfare Establishment, of which he then became commandant.

Weir's final posting, on 30 October 1964, was to Washington, D.C., as deputy to the British representative on the NATO Military Committee and deputy head of the British Defence Staff (Washington). He died suddenly there of a heart attack on 5 August 1965.
