= George Brian Sinclair =

British Army officer (1928–2020)

Major-General George Brian Sinclair CB CBE DL
- Born: 21 July 1928; Shirley, Warwickshire
- Died: 17 May 2020 (aged 91)
- Military career
- Allegiance: United Kingdom
- Branch: British Army
- Service years: 1948–83
- Rank: Major-General
- Nickname: Gus
- Unit: Royal Engineers
- Commands: Engineer in Chief (Army) (1980–83)
- Awards: Commander of the Order of the British Empire (1975); Companion of the Order of the Bath (1983)

Major-General George Brian Sinclair CB CBE DL (21 July 1928 – 17 May 2020) was a British Army officer. After the Royal Military Academy Sandhurst Sinclair joined the Royal Engineers in 1948. He served in Korea during the aftermath of the Korean War and was quickly appointed adjutant of his regiment. Sinclair served as adjutant of the British garrison on Kiritimati for the Operation Grapple thermonuclear weapon tests. From 1969 he was Commander Royal Engineers Near East Land Forces, based at the Sovereign Base Areas of Akrotiri and Dhekelia and was responsible for recovering buildings from a British training base abandoned in the aftermath of the 1969 Libyan coup d'état.

Sinclair served as head of the general staff of I Corps, British Army of the Rhine in the late 1970s. He was Engineer in Chief (Army) from 1980 to 1983. During this time Sinclair served on the Falkland Islands in the aftermath of the 1982 war and was responsible for persuading the government to construct a new runway (that became RAF Mount Pleasant) rather than improving the existing Stanley airfield. Sinclair retired in 1983 but retained a connection to the military through honorary appointments with the Corps of Royal Engineers, the Airfield Damage Repair Squadrons, Royal Engineers (Volunteers) and the Engineer and Railway Staff Corps. In civilian life he worked for Tarmac Group on the construction of the Channel Tunnel and was a member of the Smeatonian Society of Civil Engineers.

== Early life and career ==
George Brian Sinclair was born in Shirley, Warwickshire, (now in the West Midlands) on 21 July 1928 to Thomas Stoddart Sinclair, a civil engineer and businessman, and his wife Blanche. He attended Christ's College, Finchley and, from 1945, the Royal Military Academy Sandhurst to train as a British Army officer. Whilst there Sinclair acquired the nickname "Gus" in unclear circumstance, but by which he became best known. Sinclair was commissioned as a second lieutenant in the Royal Engineers on 21 October 1948 and spent the next two years in a training regiment. He was promoted to lieutenant on 21 October 1950 and given command of a troop of 25 Field Squadron, which was then a sub-unit of 27 Field Engineer Regiment with the British Army of the Rhine. Sinclair afterwards served as intelligence and signals officer of the regiment.

Sinclair was posted to Korea in 1953, though he queried his orders as they had been sent after the Korean War had ended in a ceasefire. Upon reporting to his unit, 28 Field Engineer Regiment, he found his arrival was unexpected and, with no military tasks requiring his attention, he was put to work designing a sewerage system for a civilian village. Sinclair found more conventional military employment after his appointment as adjutant when the previous incumbent was dismissed for unsuitable behaviour. Sinclair was promoted to captain on 21 October 1954 and left Korea the following year.

== Operation Grapple ==
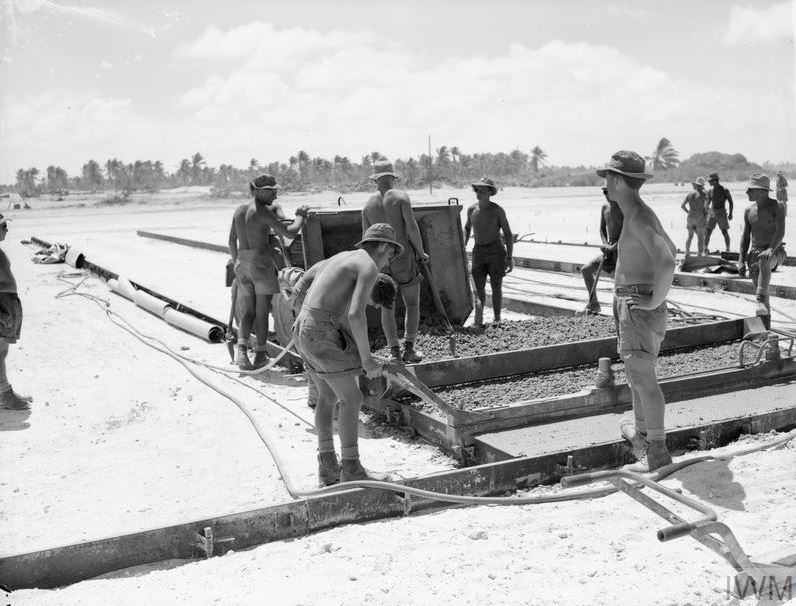
Royal Engineers constructing a runway at Kiritimati, November 1956

In 1956 Sinclair was appointed a staff officer to Major-General John Woollett, the chief engineer of Operation Grapple, the first attempted detonation of a British-made thermonuclear weapon (hydrogen bomb). In this role he was responsible for constructing an airfield and air-conditioned bomb-storage facilities at Malden Island in the British colony of the Gilbert and Ellice Islands. The tests in May and June did not reach achieve megaton equivalence and were regarded as failures; a series of additional tests were ordered at Kiritimati, some 400 miles (640 km) to the north. Sinclair was appointed adjutant of the Royal Engineer regiment supporting these tests. He disputed orders from the Ministry of Defence (MoD), requiring him to arrange for the island's entire 100-mile (160 km) coastline to be patrolled against landings by Soviet spies. Sinclair considered that five infantry battalions would be required to achieve this; this was disputed by the MoD who sent out a Royal Air Force group captain to investigate. This officer agreed with Sinclair's assessment and the patrol orders were subsequently rescinded. Operation Grapple successfully delivered a megaton-level explosion in November.

Sinclair directly witnessed a number of nuclear tests during Operation Grapple, and in the late 1970s was asked to provide evidence in the case of a sergeant who died from leukaemia. The sergeant's widow claimed he had contracted the cancer as a result of his official duties of photographing the tests. Sinclair supported the widow and provided evidence that the sergeant had been in close proximity to the test sites, despite pressure from an MoD permanent under-secretary not to become involved in the case.

== Senior roles ==
Sinclair was promoted to major on 21 October 1961 and to lieutenant colonel 30 June 1967. In 1969 he was appointed Commander Royal Engineers Near East Land Forces, based at the Sovereign Base Areas of Akrotiri and Dhekelia. Following the September 1969 Libyan coup d'état in which King Idris was deposed by Colonel Gaddafi, the MoD issued orders to abandon a base in the Libyan desert, which had been intended for use in training British forces. Sinclair argued that the buildings erected at the site were valuable and could be used at other British bases. He flew to the site with Air Marshal Denis Smallwood, Air Officer Commanding-in-Chief, Near East Air Force, and his subsequent report persuaded the MoD to authorise the recovery of 85 Twynham huts, 2 aircraft hangars and a number of storage sheds. Sinclair returned from Cyprus in 1971.

Sinclair was promoted colonel on 30 June 1972 and by 1 January 1975, when he was appointed a Commander of the Order of the British Empire in the 1975 New Year Honours, held a position at the MoD. He was afterwards appointed as head of the general staff of I Corps, stationed in Germany with the British Army of the Rhine. Sinclair was promoted to brigadier on 30 June 1975 and the following year became commandant of the Royal School of Military Engineering in Chatham. During this posting Sinclair was attacked by a mugger on Chatham Common and fought off his assailant. Sinclair was appointed Engineer in Chief (Army) on 1 July 1980 and granted the acting rank of major general. His rank was confirmed as substantive on 29 November 1980, with seniority backdated to 1 April 1980.

== The Falklands and retirement ==
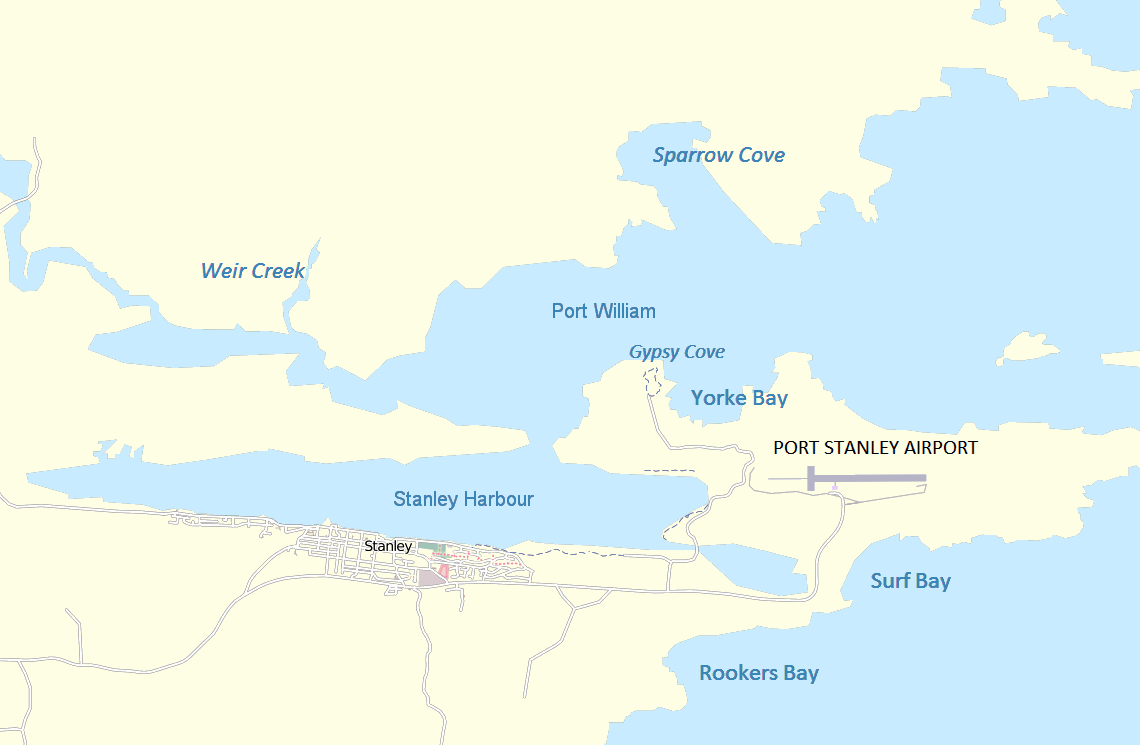
Map shows Port Stanley Airport and surrounding area.

Sinclair played an important role in the reconstruction of the Falkland Islands after the 1982 war ended in June and became known among the British forces on the islands as "that Sapper brigadier who solves problems and gets things done". A key task was to get the runway at Stanley airfield repaired and improved for use Phantom fighter jets. These could take over air defence duties from the Royal Navy's Sea Harriers and allow the two aircraft carriers, which had been on active duty since April, to return to home waters. British prime minister Margaret Thatcher was keen for the army to carry out the necessary works so that the money would come from the defence budget. Sinclair found that the necessary work could not take place while the runway was in use for other traffic and recommended instead that a new runway be built elsewhere by civilian contractors from general government funds. The funding issue brought Sinclair into dispute with the defence secretary John Nott, during which Sinclair came close to resigning his commission. In January 1983 Michael Heseltine was appointed as Nott's successor and resolved the matter. Heseltine asked Sinclair to clear the current runway of mines and install metal matting to allow temporary use by Phantoms of No. 23 Squadron RAF and Hercules transport aircraft; work on a permanent replacement (RAF Mount Pleasant) was begun by contractors in 1983. In recognition of his work in the Falklands Sinclair was appointed a Companion of the Order of the Bath in the 1983 New Year Honours.

Sinclair was appointed to the honorary and ceremonial role of colonel commandant of the Corps of Royal Engineers on 25 March 1983. On 18 April his appointment as engineer in chief ended and he retired from the army on 13 June. After retirement Sinclair worked for the contractor Tarmac Group, including during the construction of the Channel Tunnel (1988–1994). He was appointed honorary colonel of the Airfield Damage Repair Squadrons, Royal Engineers (Volunteers) of the Territorial Army on 1 May 1984. On 23 July 1988 Sinclair was appointed honorary colonel of the Engineer and Railway Staff Corps, a unit of civilian experts that provide engineering and logistics advice to the army. His honorary appointment with the Airfield Damage Repair Squadrons ended on 30 November 1988; with the Corps of Royal Engineers on 26 March 1991 and with the renamed Engineer and Transport Staff Corps on 28 October 1993.

== Personal life and other interests ==
Sinclair married Margaret Richardson from Armagh, Northern Ireland, in 1953; they had two sons and a daughter together. Margaret died in 2011. In retirement Sinclair lived at St Boswells in the Scottish Borders where he enjoyed walking.

Sinclair was admitted as a member of the Smeatonian Society of Civil Engineers, a dining and discussion group, in 1985. From 1990 to 2000 he served as a trustee of the Imperial War Museum and contributed to a documentary about Britain's nuclear programme. Sinclair also worked at the Staff College, Camberley where he organised battlefield tours for the students. On 1 March 1996 he was appointed deputy lieutenant for the county of Kent. Sinclair wrote The Staff Corps: The History of the Engineer and Logistic Staff Corps RE which was published by the Royal Engineers Museum in 2001. He collaborated with Colonel D.J. Hindle to produce a second edition in 2015 to mark the 150th anniversary of the corps.

Sinclair died on 17 May 2020.
