= John W. White (general) =

United States Air Force general

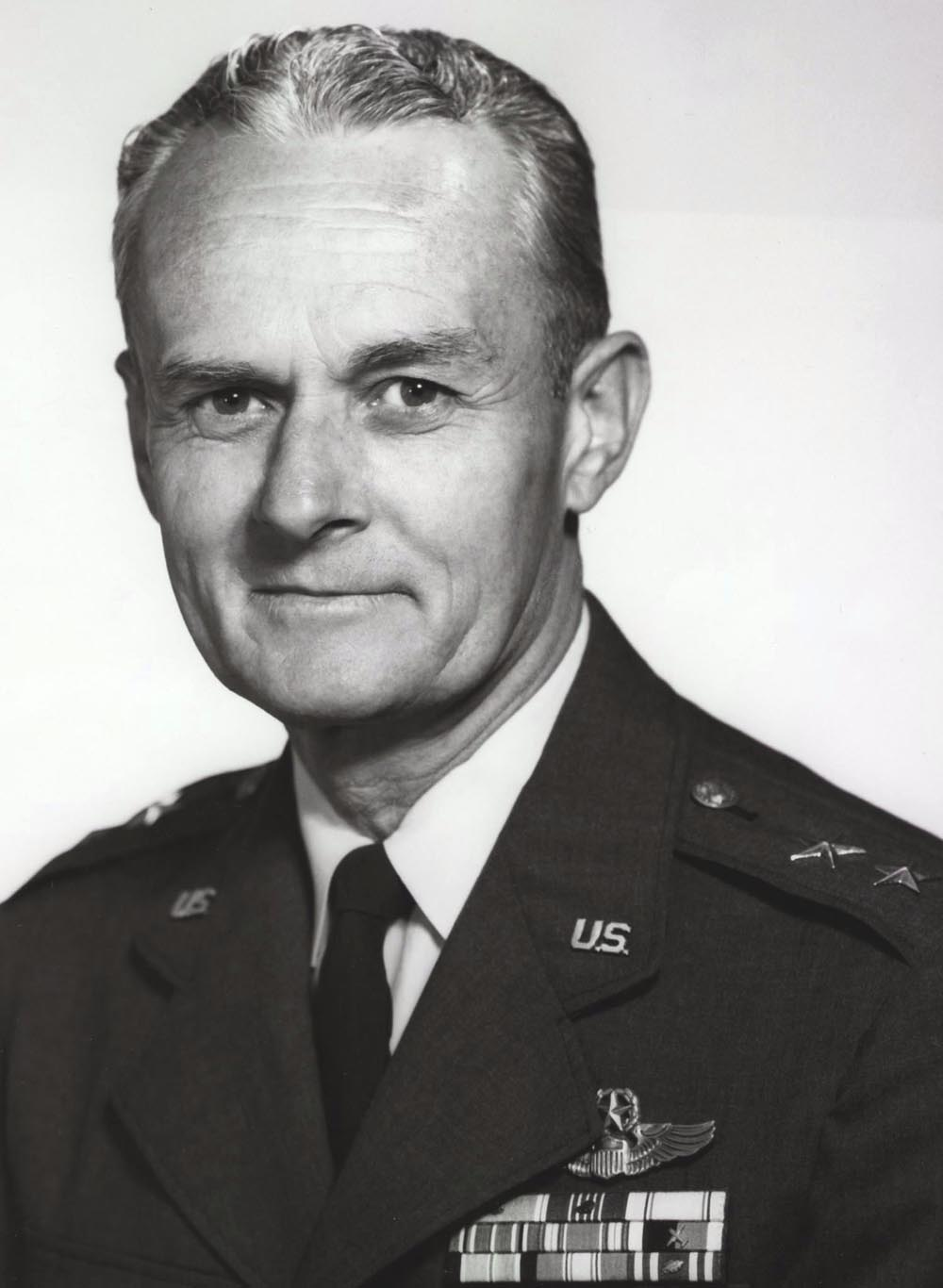
- Born: 16 June 1910; Uvalde, Texas, US
- Died: 16 November 1992 (aged 82); San Antonio, Texas, US
- Burial place: Fort Sam Houston National Cemetery, San Antonio, US
- Children: 1d, 1s
- Relatives: José Antonio Navarro (great uncle)
- Military career
- Allegiance: United States
- Branch: United States Army (1934–1947); United States Air Force (1947–1966)
- Service years: 1934–1966
- Rank: Major General
- Service number: 0-19550
- Commands: Childress Army Air Field; Midland Army Air Field; 485th Bombardment Group; Mather Air Force Base; Iceland Defense Force; 3079th Aviation Depot Wing; Air Force Special Weapons Center
- Conflicts: World War II
- Awards: Air Force Distinguished Service Medal; Legion of Merit (2); Commendation Medal (2); Order of the Falcon (Iceland)

John William White (16 June 1910 – 16 November 1992) was a United States Air Force general. A graduate of the United States Military Academy at West Point, New York class of 1934, he served in training assignments during World War II. After the war he was a staff officer with the United States Air Forces in Europe during the Berlin Airlift, and he was the deputy chief of the Armed Forces Special Weapons Project and its successor, the Defense Atomic Support Agency, from 1957 to 1960.

== Early life ==
John William White was born in Uvalde, Texas, on 16 June 1910, the oldest child of John William White and his wife Edna née Martin. José Antonio Navarro, a signatory of the Texas Declaration of Independence, was his great uncle. He attended St. Edward's University for a year and Texas A&M for a semester, before entering the United States Military Academy at West Point, New York, on 1 July 1930. At West Point he was a cheerleader and the first sergeant of F Company.

White graduated on 12 June 1934, ranked 202nd in the class of 1934, and was commissioned as a second lieutenant in the infantry. He briefly served with the 6th Infantry at Jefferson Barracks, Missouri, for a fortnight before reporting to Randolph Field, Texas, on 1 October 1934 as a student officer at the United States Army Air Corps Primary Flying School there. He graduated on 20 June 1935, and then went to the Advanced Flying School at Kelly Field, Texas, from which he graduated rated as a pilot and air observer on 20 October 1935.

On 5 November 1935, White joined the 19th Bombardment Group at March Field, California, where he qualified as a navigator and a bombardier. He transferred to the Air Corps on 25 February 1936, and was promoted to first lieutenant on 12 June 1937. He attended the Communications Course at the Air Corps from 25 September 1937 to 30 June 1938, and then returned to Randolph Field as a communications instructor. White married Patricia (Patsy) Krausse. The couple had a daughter and a son.

== World War II ==
For most of World War II, White served as an instructor. He was a bombing instructor at Lowry Army Air Field in Colorado, from August 1940 to February 1941, at Ellington Army Air Field in Texas as the Director of Bombing Training from February to November 1941, at Midland Army Air Field in Texas as the Director of Flight Training from November 1941 to May 1942, and at Big Spring Army Air Field in Texas from May to November 1942. He was the base commanding officer of Childress Army Air Field in Texas from November 1942 until November 1944, and then at Midland Army Air Force Field until June 1945. For his services he was awarded two Commendation Ribbons and the Legion of Merit. He was promoted to captain on 9 September 1940, major on 24 July 1941, lieutenant colonel on 23 January 1942 and colonel on 1 August 1944.

His Legion of Merit citation read:

Colonel John W. White, 019550, Air Corps, U.S. Army. As director of bombardier training at Midland and Big Spring, Texas, and as commanding officer, Childress and Midland Army Air fields, during the period from November 1941 until June 1945. Colonel White selected sites, negotiated for leases and supervised construction of bombing targets for three Bombardier Schools totaling 56 separate sites. Field training exercises and competitive bombing meets initiated by Colonel White were designed to raise the standards of bombing to the degree most suited to the combat needs of the Army Air Forces.

In September 1945, White became the commanding officer of the 485th Bombardment Group. Based at Smoky Hill Army Air Field, it was equipped with the Boeing B-29 Superfortress and earmarked for duty in the Pacific, but the war ended before it could deploy.

== Post-war ==
In March 1946, White deployed to Europe as the A-3 (staff officer responsible for operations) on the staff of the United States Air Forces in Europe (USAFE). In June 1948, he became the Director of Plans of the US and British Combined Airlift Task Force, which carried out the Berlin Airlift. He transferred to the newly formed United States Air Force (USAF) with the rank of lieutenant colonel on 1 July 1948.

White returned to the United States in August 1949, and attended the Air War College at Maxwell Air Force Base in Alabama, where he was promoted to colonel again on 19 October 1949. From 1950 to 1953 he was the base commander at Mather Air Force Base in California. He attended the National War College in Washington, D.C., from August 1953 to June 1954. He then spent a year as the deputy chief of the Policy Division in the Air Force Plans Directorate, and as a member of the Joint Strategic Plans Group in the Office of the Joint Chiefs of Staff.

Promoted to the rank of brigadier general in July 1955, he became commander of the Iceland Defense Force. For this, he was awarded the Order of the Falcon by the government of Iceland in 1957, and an oak leaf cluster to his Legion of Merit. His citation read:

Brigadier General John W. White distinguished himself by exceptionally meritorious conduct in the performance of outstanding service to the United States from 3 August 1955 to 19 August 1957 as commander, Iceland Defense Force. In this important and responsible assignment, General White's outstanding ability, policy insight, planning and programming have contributed to the establishment of objective goals to meet future requirements. The leadership, outstanding devotion to duty and initiative displayed by General White reflect great credit upon himself and the United States Air Force.

White's subsequent career was with nuclear weapons. He was the deputy chief of the Armed Forces Special Weapons Project and its successor, the Defense Atomic Support Agency, from August 1957 to August 1960. As such, he was an observer at the British Operation Grapple nuclear tests in the Pacific. From August 1960 to July 1962 he was the assistant for special weapons and commander of the 3079th Aviation Depot Wing of the Air Force Logistics Command, which was located at Wright-Patterson Air Force Base in Ohio. He then became the commander of the Air Force Special Weapons Center at Kirtland Air Force Base in New Mexico. For this service he was awarded the Air Force Distinguished Service Medal. He retired from the USAF on 1 April 1966.

== Later life ==
In retirement, White was involved in water conservation as the executive director and later a member of the board of directors of the Nueces River Authority. He died in San Antonio on 16 November 1992, and was buried in Fort Sam Houston National Cemetery there.
