= KCDS =

KCDS may refer to:

- Childress Municipal Airport (ICAO code KCDS)
- KCDS-LP, a low-power radio station (90.1 FM) licensed to serve Tucson, Arizona, United States
