= Twynham hut =

Military hut used by the British military until 1982

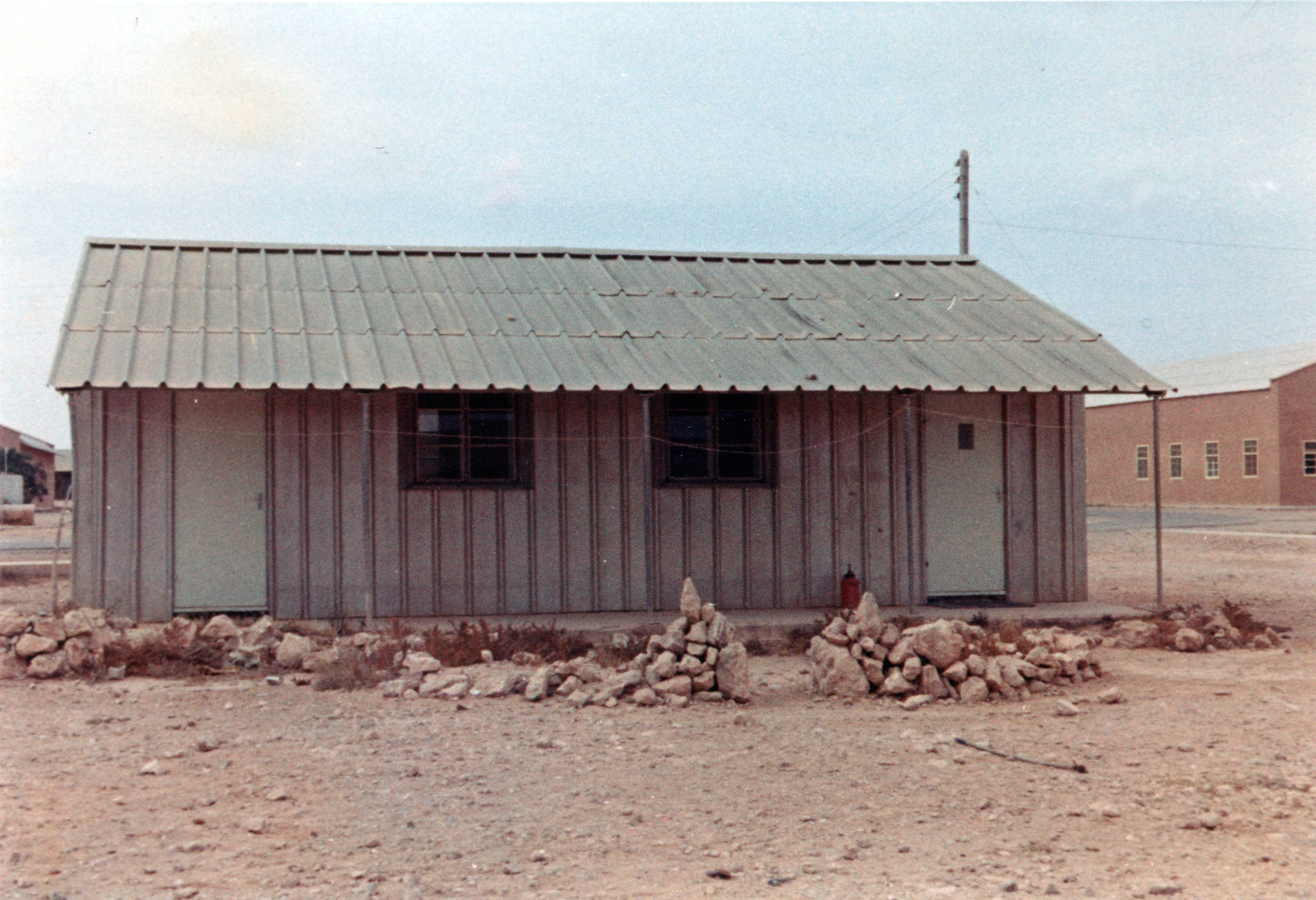
Twynham hut at RAF El Adem in 1969

The Twynham hut was developed by the British War Office in 1959 as a replacement for the Nissen hut which was first used in 1916. It was constructed of individual 8-foot (2.4 m) bays which made the roof stronger than that of its predecessor. Huts are known to have been constructed in lengths between 16 feet (4.9 m) and 128 feet (39 m). Although four times the cost of Nissen huts the Twynham hut was considered more comfortable and aesthetically pleasing; it also had twice the design life and could be fitted with air conditioning. The huts remained in use until at least 1982.

== Description ==
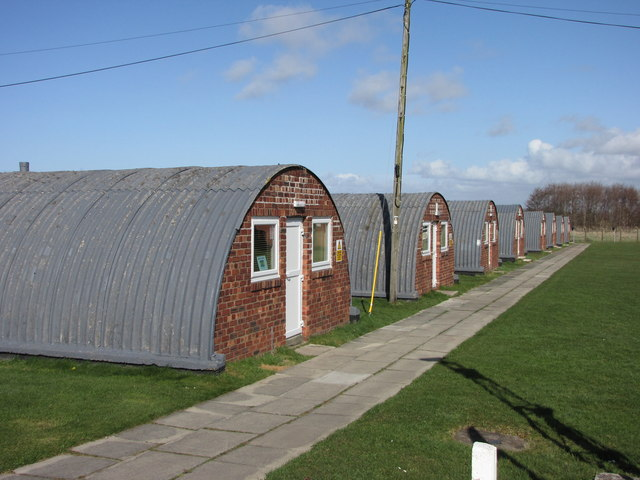
Nissen huts

The Twynham hut was developed for the War Office by the Military Engineering Experimental Establishment in 1959. It was intended as a replacement for the corrugated steel curved-roof Nissen hut that was first introduced in 1916. The Twynham hut was intended for similar use, as a temporary accommodation structure in field conditions and emergency situations. The design was jointly agreed with all three armed services: the British Army, Royal Navy and Royal Air Force.

The Twynham hut was constructed from aluminium and galvanised steel and had a pitched roof. The standard hut was 64 feet (20 m) long but it could also be constructed in half (32-foot, 9.8 m) and quarter (16-foot, 4.9 m) lengths, with the front bay remaining unchanged. It could also be lengthened and in most installations in the field 96-foot (29 m) and 128-foot (39 m) units were common. The huts were formed from 8-foot (2.4 m) bays, shorter than similar huts, which allowed for a greater wind and snow loading to the roof and for use of soils of lower bearing capacity. One Royal Pioneer Corps lieutenant-colonel likened the huts to a Meccano set.

The half-length hut provided a floor area of 640 square feet (59 m^{2}) and weighed 5.25 long tons (5.33 t). When packaged for transport the overall weight was 16 long tons (16 t); the hut was intended to be man-portable and erected by a team of 10 soldiers. The unit was erected on a 4-inch (10 cm) deep concrete foundation with a volume of 12 cubic yards (9.2 m^{3}). A heavier duty version was constructed for use in the tropics, which weighed 0.85 long tons (0.86 t) more and required a larger foundation of 14.6 cubic yards (11.2 m^{3}). The design life of both variants was 20 years. In 1966 a Twynham hut was estimated to cost £5.47 per square foot (£58.87 per square metre) including transport and installation costs.

By comparison a Nissen hut providing 570 square feet (53 m^{2}) of space weighed just 2.32 long tons (2.36 t) and was around a quarter of the cost of a same-sized Twynham hut. However the Twynham hut provided a greater standard of comfort and was aesthetically more pleasing; the Nissen hut also only had a design life of 10 years. One Royal Engineers officer stated that the Twynham hut was more suited to dismantling and re-erection than the Nissens. A Royal Engineers report of 1966 regarded the Twynham hut as well suited for long-term use in the tropics, but recommended that the Nissen, still held in large quantities in army stores, be preferred in temperate climates. Because of its higher cost the Twynham hut was not recommended for short-term uses.

The huts could be used as accommodation for personnel, as offices or as stores. When used for personnel they could have false ceilings fitted and be fitted with air conditioning units, each of which weighed 1 long ton (1.0 t). In the store configuration additional partitions and internal doors could be fitted. Internal furnishings were provided by the Ministry of Works.

== In service ==
The Twynham hut was trialled by 12 Pioneers on Cyprus in 1960 in the lead-up to independence. Because British forces were being withdrawn from positions across the island to the Sovereign Base Areas of Akrotiri and Dhekelia additional accommodation was required at these locations. Despite doubts over how quick they would be to install, more than 400 Twynham huts would be constructed in the bases over the following months. This ended, for the first time, the use of tented accommodation for British troops on the island.

In Aden in 1966, a unit of the Pioneers carried out a speed demonstration in which they erected a 16-foot (4.9 m) Twynham hut in four minutes. The huts could be readily dismantled and reused elsewhere as was done later in 1966 and 1967 when the British withdrew from the country. Lieutenant-colonel Gus Sinclair recovered 85 Twynham huts from an abandoned British base in the aftermath of the September 1969 Libyan coup d'état. The Twynham huts were still in use in 1982 when they formed part of the aircrew accommodation at Wideawake airfield on Ascension Island during the Falklands War.
