= Joint Warfare Establishment =

- Active: 1963-1978
- Country: United Kingdom
- Type: Training
- Role: Joint warfare training
- Garrison/HQ: Old Sarum, Wiltshire

The Joint Warfare Establishment was a British military training establishment based at Old Sarum in Wiltshire.

== History ==
The Joint Warfare Establishment was formed at Old Sarum in Wiltshire on 31 March 1963 when the School of Land/Air Warfare (formed in 1947 at Old Sarum) was merged with the Amphibious Warfare School (formerly based at Poole). Its first commandant was Air Vice-Marshal Cecil Weir. Its role was to teach officers from the three services to work as one unit when fighting local wars; typical courses lasted 10 days at a time and each course was attended by about 50 officers mainly of major or lieutenant rank. However the establishment also had more specialist roles as the training centre for British psychological warfare operations and as the training centre for forward air controller training. The establishment was disbanded in 1978 when such courses were transferred to the Joint Warfare Wing of the National Defence College at Latimer.
