= John Woollett =

British Army officer

Major-General John Woollett CBE MC
- Born: 5 November 1915; Streatham, County of London, England
- Died: 30 May 2007 (aged 91)
- Military career
- Allegiance: United Kingdom
- Branch: British Army
- Service years: 1935–1970
- Rank: Major-General
- Service number: 66051
- Unit: Royal Engineers
- Commands: 16 Field Squadron (1942–1945); 51 Port Squadron (c. 1950–1952); 28 Field Engineer Regiment (1954–1956); Transportation Training Centre (1964–1965)
- Conflicts: World War II
- Awards: Commander of the Order of the British Empire (1958); Officer of the Order of the British Empire (1955); Military Cross (1945)

Major-General John Castle Woollett CBE MC (5 November 1915 – 30 May 2007) was a British Army officer. He joined the Royal Engineers in 1935 and studied for a degree in mechanical sciences at St John's College, Cambridge. Woollett joined the British Expeditionary Force (BEF) in France in September 1939, at the start of the Second World War. After the BEF was evacuated to the United Kingdom in 1940 he volunteered for commando service. Woollett commanded the demolition engineers in Operation Archery, a 1941 raid on Vågsøy in German-occupied Norway. He commanded 16 Field Squadron (later 16 Assault Squadron), an armoured engineer unit, from 1942. With the 79th Armoured Division he took part in the North-West Europe campaign of 1944–45, assisting with river crossings and demolition of German strongholds, and won the Military Cross.

After the war Woollett attended the Staff College, Camberley, and was sent to Burma to help prepare their armed forces for independence. He returned to the United Kingdom to command 51 Port Squadron and instruct at the Staff College. He was appointed to command 28 Field Engineer Regiment in 1954 in the aftermath of the Korean War. From 1956 Woollett led the engineering aspects of the Operation Grapple thermonuclear tests. He afterwards held staff roles with the NATO Northern Army Group and the British Army of the Rhine (BAOR). Woollett commanded the Transportation Training Centre from 1964 and from 1967 to his retirement in 1970 was chief engineer to the BAOR. In retirement Woollett was a principal planning inspector for the Department of the Environment. He also remained involved with the Royal Engineers as their colonel commandant (1974–78), as president of the Institution of Royal Engineers (1974–79) and skipper of vessels for the Royal Engineers' Yacht Club.

== Early life and career ==
John Castle Woollett was born in Streatham, County of London, on 5 November 1915. He attended the Roman Catholic St Benedict's School, Ealing, before entering the Royal Military Academy, Woolwich, as a gentleman cadet. Woollett was commissioned from the academy as a second lieutenant in the Royal Engineers on 29 August 1935. He afterwards read mechanical sciences at St John's College, Cambridge, and while there rowed at the Henley Royal Regatta. Woollett graduated with a bachelor of arts degree in 1938 and on 29 August of that year was promoted to lieutenant.

== Second World War ==
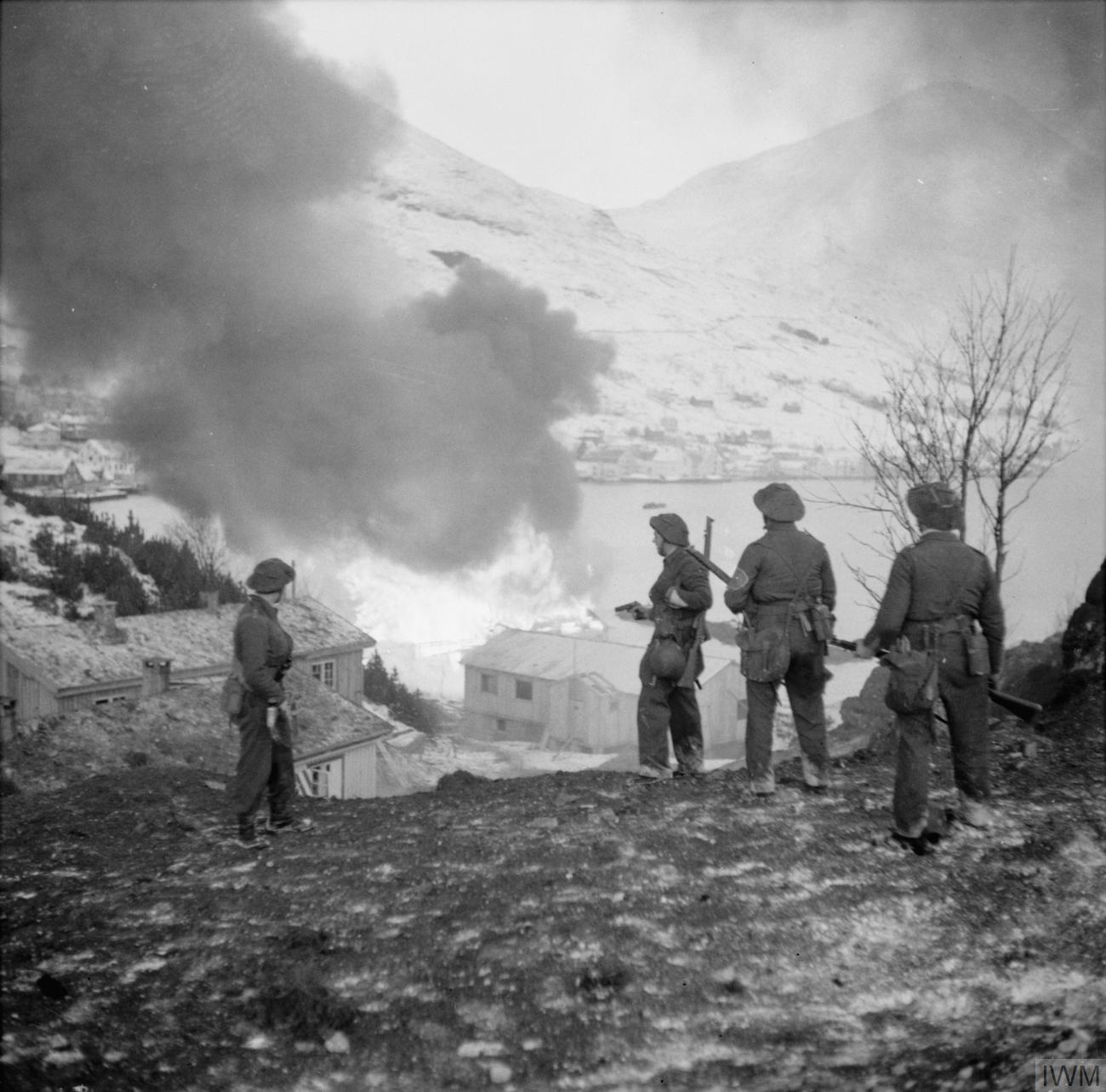
Demolitions during Operation Archery

Woollett was deployed to France with the British Expeditionary Force at the start of the Second World War. Serving with 23 Field Company as part of the 1st Infantry Division he was evacuated from Dunkirk in May/June 1940. Woollett's unit did not see active service in the following months and he volunteered for commando service. He served with No. 6 Commando and led the engineer (demolition) element of Operation Archery, a 27 December 1941 raid on Vågsøy in German-occupied Norway. Earlier that year he had married Joan Stranks and the couple had three sons together.

In 1942 Woollett was given command of 16 Field Squadron. The following year the unit converted to 16 Assault Squadron, part of the 42nd Assault Regiment in the 79th Armoured Division. Woollett was promoted to captain on 29 August 1943 and would lead 16 Assault Brigade throughout the North-West Europe campaign of 1944–45. Woollett and his unit assisted in the capture of Le Havre in September 1944 and the clearing of the Scheldt Estuary in October/November. During the advance on the Rhine in early 1945 he played a key role in developing heavy rafting equipment and techniques for crossing stretches of water. Woollett was commended for his handling of vehicles and supplies during the March 1945 crossing of the Rhine.

Woollett and his unit took part in Operation Forrard On, the British advance on Bremen. During the advance to Haselünne, and whilst under German artillery and mortar fire, he constructed a bridge across a watercourse that was preventing his brigade from advancing. Woollett played a key role in overcoming the German resistance at Cloppenburg. German troops were holed up in buildings in the town and British infantry were unable to approach. Woollett led his specialist Churchill armoured vehicles, equipped with demolition mortars and dozer blades, into the town through panzerfaust and small arms fire. His men were able to destroy many of the German strongholds, allowing the infantry to advance and capture the town. On 11 October 1945 he was awarded the Military Cross for his good work during the campaign.

== Post-war ==
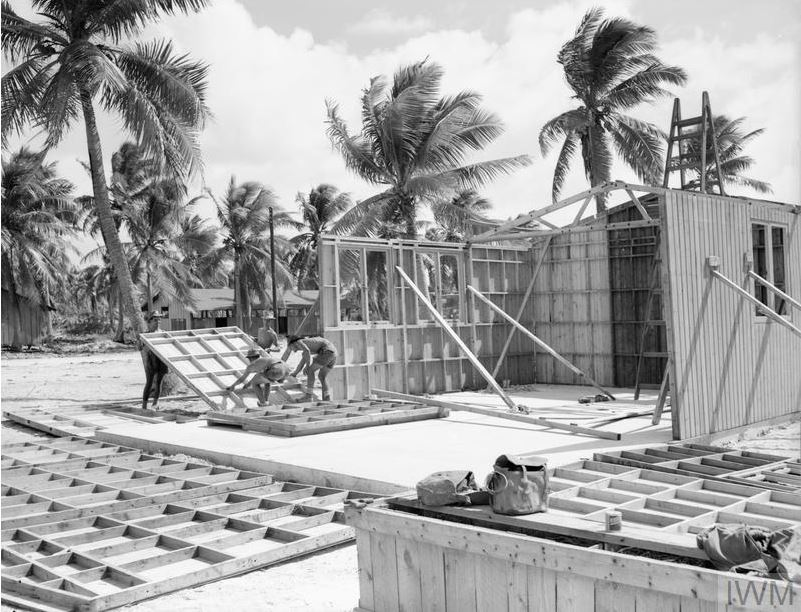
Royal Engineers assemble huts on Christmas Island for Operation Grapple

After the war Woollett attended the Staff College, Camberley, and, in 1946, was posted to Burma as a staff officer to help the country prepare its armed forces for post-independence roles. When Burmese General Aung San, who was intended to become prime minister of the nation, was assassinated in 1947 the independence programme was brought forward to 1948. Nevertheless Woollett remained in independent Burma until 1950, working with the British Mission and as an instructor at the Burmese Army's Staff College. He was promoted to major on 29 August 1948.

Woollett returned to England to command 51 Port Squadron and afterwards served as an instructor at the Staff College in Camberley. In 1953 he served as technical adviser for a British Army instructional film on how to carry out demolition and mining operations during a withdrawal. In 1954 he was appointed to command 28 Field Engineer Regiment, which was then in Korea for the Korean War. The Korean Armistice Agreement had come into effect and fighting had largely ceased; Woollett led the unit, except for 55 Field Squadron, back to Britain. He was appointed an Officer of the Order of the British Empire in the 9 June 1955 Birthday Honours for his service in Korea, by this time he held the temporary rank of lieutenant-colonel. Woollett was appointed to the brevet rank of lieutenant-colonel on 1 July 1955 and to the substantive rank on 1 November 1956.

In 1956 Woollett was appointed chief engineer, with the temporary rank of Colonel, for the Operation Grapple thermonuclear tests held on Christmas Island. A significant engineering operation was required to construct infrastructure on the island to support testing, particularly after the target site was moved to Christmas Island from the more distant Malden Island. Woollett was appointed a Commander of the Order of the British Empire in the 1958 New Year Honours for his work on Grapple. After the tests he was appointed General Staff Officer (Grade 1) with responsibility for planning at the headquarters of the NATO Northern Army Group and was then an instructor at the United States Army Command and General Staff College. His marriage was dissolved in 1957 and he married Helen Wendy Willis in 1959. Woollett was promoted to colonel on 5 November 1959 and was afterwards deputy quartermaster general, with responsibility for movement of supplies, with the British Army of the Rhine.

== Senior roles ==
Woollett was promoted to brigadier on 31 August 1964 and appointed commandant of the Transportation Training Centre at Longmoor, Hampshire. He commanded the centre during its conversion into the Army School of Transport and transfer from the Royal Engineers to the Royal Corps of Transport in 1965. After the transfer of the school Woollett was placed on the supernumerary list until he was appointed deputy engineer-in-chief to the British Army in 1966. On 7 September 1967 he was appointed chief engineer to the British Army of the Rhine, initially with the acting rank of major-general, but on 30 October he was promoted to the substantive rank. Woollett left the position on 9 September 1970 and retired from the army on 3 December.

In retirement Woollett worked as a principal planning inspector for the Department of the Environment, holding the post from 1971 until 1987. Between 1981 and 1985 he sat on the panel of independent planning inspectors. Woollett was appointed to the honorary role of Colonel Commandant of the Royal Engineers in 1974 and held the position until 25 March 1978. Between 1974 and 1979 he was president of the Institution of Royal Engineers. One of his achievements in this role was to initiate the establishment of the Royal Engineers Historical Society in December 1979. Woollett also skippered Royal Engineers' Yacht Club vessels in numerous races including two Fastnet Races.

Woollett's second wife died on 15 August 2003, and he himself died on 30 May 2007.
