= School of Land/Air Warfare =

Royal Air Force school in Wiltshire

The School of Land/Air Warfare was a Royal Air Force school based at Old Sarum in Wiltshire. Its purpose was to encourage greater co-operation between officers in the air and those on the ground.

== History ==
The School was originally established at Old Sarum in 1920 as the School of Army Co-operation to provide training for air officers supporting troops on the ground. This became the School of Air Support in 1945 when its remit was broadened to cover assistance by air in amphibious operations. It was reformed again in May 1947, within No. 11 Group, as the School of Land/Air Warfare. In March 1963 it merged with the Amphibious Warfare School (formerly based at Poole) to form the Joint Warfare Establishment.
