= Operation Grapple =

Series of British nuclear weapons tests

Grapple
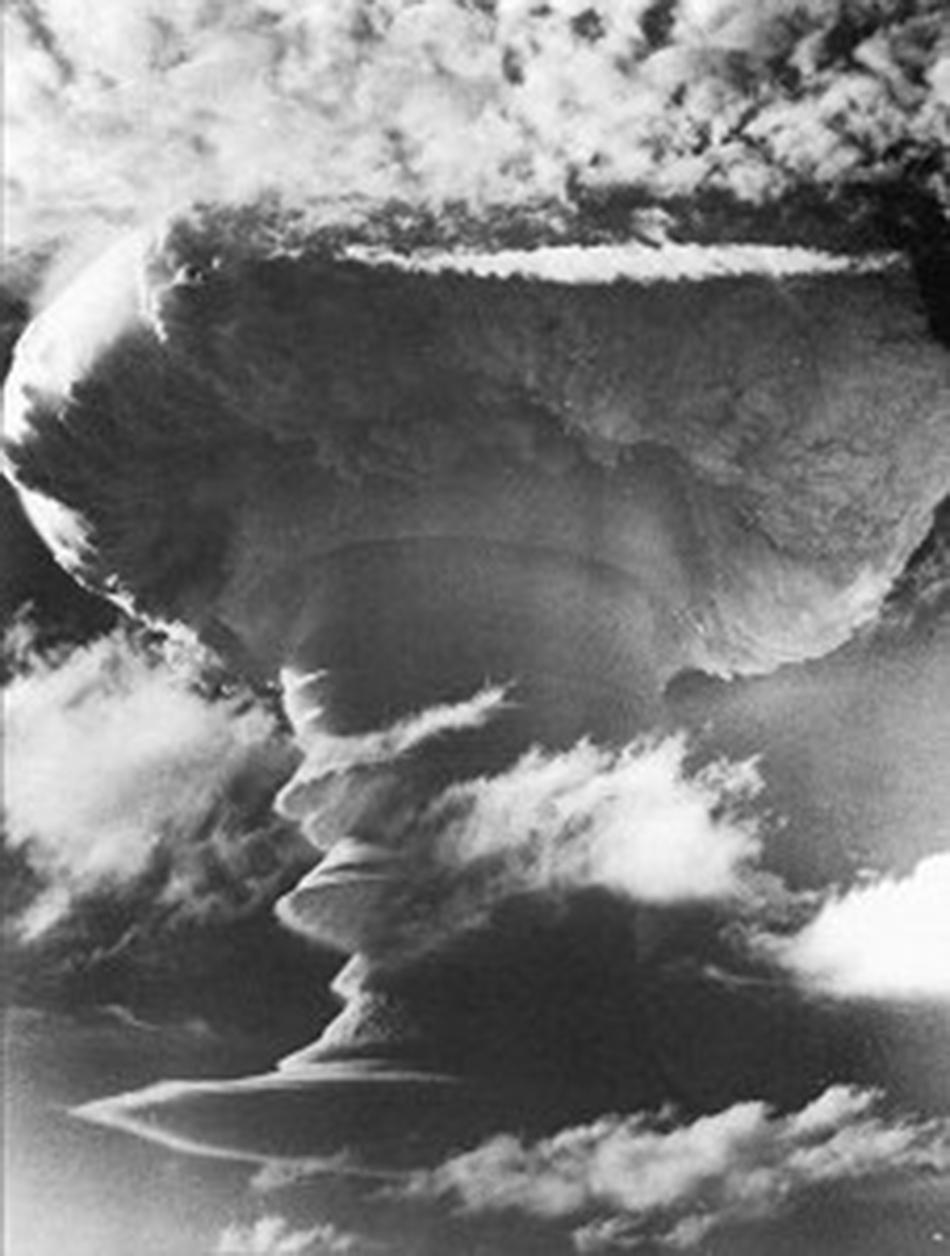
- Grapple X test in November 1957. Britain's first fully successful hydrogen bomb test

Information
- Country: United Kingdom
- Test site: Kiritimati (Christmas Island), Kiribati; Malden Island, Kiribati
- Period: 1957–1958
- Number of tests: 9
- Test type: Air drop, balloon
- Max. yield: 3 megatonnes of TNT (12.6 PJ)

Test series chronology

Operation Grapple was a set of four series of British nuclear weapons tests of early atomic bombs and hydrogen bombs carried out in 1957 and 1958 at Malden Island and Kiritimati (Christmas Island) in the Gilbert and Ellice Islands in the Pacific Ocean (modern Kiribati) as part of the British hydrogen bomb programme. Nine nuclear explosions were initiated, culminating in the United Kingdom becoming the third recognised possessor of thermonuclear weapons, and the restoration of the nuclear Special Relationship with the United States in the form of the 1958 US–UK Mutual Defence Agreement.

During the Second World War, Britain had a nuclear weapons project, codenamed Tube Alloys, which was merged with the American Manhattan Project in August 1943. Many of Britain's top scientists participated in the Manhattan Project. After the war, fearing that Britain would lose its great power status, the British government resumed the atomic bomb development effort, now codenamed High Explosive Research.

The successful test of an atomic bomb in Operation Hurricane in October 1952 represented an extraordinary scientific and technological achievement, but Britain was still several years behind the United States, which had developed the more powerful thermonuclear weapons in the meantime. In July 1954, the Cabinet agreed that the maintenance of great power status required that Britain also develop thermonuclear weapons.

The United Kingdom Atomic Energy Authority Atomic Weapons Research Establishment at Aldermaston produced three designs: Orange Herald, a large boosted fission weapon; Green Bamboo, an interim thermonuclear design; and Green Granite, a true thermonuclear weapon. The new designs had to be tested to demonstrate that they worked, hence Operation Grapple. The first series consisted of three tests in May and June 1957. In the first test, Grapple 1, a version of Green Granite known as Short Granite was dropped from a Vickers Valiant bomber flown by Wing Commander Kenneth Hubbard. The bomb's yield was estimated at 300 kilotonnes of TNT (1,260 TJ), far below its designed capability. Despite this, the test was hailed as a successful thermonuclear explosion, and the government did not confirm or deny reports that the UK had become a third thermonuclear power. The second test, Grapple 2, was of Orange Herald; its 720-to-800-kilotonne-of-TNT (3,010 to 3,350 TJ) yield made it technically a megaton-range weapon, and the largest ever achieved by a single stage nuclear device. Grapple 3 tested Purple Granite, a version of Short Granite with some fixes; its yield was only 200 kilotonnes of TNT (837 TJ).

A second test series was required, which consisted of a single test, Grapple X, in November 1957. This time the yield of 1.8 megatonnes of TNT (7.53 PJ) exceeded expectations. It was a true hydrogen bomb, but most of its yield came from nuclear fission rather than nuclear fusion. In a third series with a single test, Grapple Y, in April 1958, another design was trialled. With an explosive yield of about 3 megatonnes of TNT (12.6 PJ), it remains the largest British nuclear weapon ever tested. The design of Grapple Y was notably successful because much of its yield came from its thermonuclear fusion reaction instead of fission of a heavy uranium-238 tamper—the dense material surrounding the core that kept the reacting mass together to increase its efficiency. Its yield had been closely predicted, indicating that its designers understood the process. A final series of four tests in August and September 1958, known as Grapple Z, tested techniques for boosting and making bombs immune to predetonation caused by nearby nuclear explosions. Two of these tests were detonations from balloons. A moratorium on testing came into effect in October 1958, and Britain never resumed atmospheric nuclear testing.

== Background ==
During the early part of the Second World War, Britain had a nuclear weapons project, codenamed Tube Alloys. At the Quebec Conference in August 1943, Prime Minister Winston Churchill and US President Franklin Roosevelt signed the Quebec Agreement, which merged Tube Alloys with the American Manhattan Project to create a combined British, American and Canadian project. The September 1944 Hyde Park Aide-Mémoire extended both commercial and military cooperation into the post-war period. Many of Britain's top scientists participated in the Manhattan Project.

The British government had trusted that America would continue to share nuclear technology, which it considered to be a joint discovery. On 16 November 1945, Churchill and Roosevelt's successors, Clement Attlee and Harry S. Truman, signed a new agreement that replaced the Quebec Agreement's requirement for "mutual consent" before using nuclear weapons with one for "prior consultation", and there was to be "full and effective cooperation in the field of atomic energy", but this was only "in the field of basic scientific research". The United States Atomic Energy Act of 1946 (McMahon Act) ended technical cooperation. The revelation of a Canadian spy ring that included British physicist Alan Nunn May while the bill was being prepared caused the United States Congress to add the death penalty for sharing "restricted data" with foreign nations. Efforts to restore the nuclear Special Relationship with the United States over the following decade were dogged by repeated spy scandals, including the arrest of Klaus Fuchs in 1950, and the defection of Guy Burgess and Donald Maclean in 1951. Fearing a resurgence of American isolationism and Britain losing its great power status, the British government restarted its own development effort, now codenamed High Explosive Research.

The successful test of an atomic bomb in Operation Hurricane in October 1952 represented an extraordinary scientific and technological achievement. Britain became the world's third nuclear power, reaffirming the country's status as a great power, but hopes that the United States would be sufficiently impressed to restore the Special Relationship were soon dashed. In November 1952, the United States conducted Ivy Mike, the first successful test of a true thermonuclear device or hydrogen bomb, a far more powerful form of nuclear weapons. Britain was therefore still several years behind in nuclear weapons technology. The Defence Policy Committee, chaired by Churchill and consisting of the senior Cabinet members, considered the political and strategic implications in June 1954, and concluded that "we must maintain and strengthen our position as a world power so that Her Majesty's Government can exercise a powerful influence in the counsels of the world." A Cabinet meeting on 27 July accepted this argument, and directed the Lord President to proceed with the development of thermonuclear weapons.

The United Kingdom Atomic Energy Authority Atomic Weapons Research Establishment at Aldermaston in Berkshire was directed by William Penney, with William Cook as his deputy. The scientists at Aldermaston did not know how to build a hydrogen bomb, but produced three megaton-range designs that were named under the Rainbow code system: Orange Herald, a large nuclear fission weapon with an enriched uranium tamper; Green Bamboo, an interim thermonuclear design in which fusion occurred in layers of lithium-6 deuteride that alternated with layers of uranium-235; (Note: In modern terminology, such an interim thermonuclear design is termed a large boosted fission device.) and Green Granite, a true thermonuclear design in which the majority of the yield came from thermonuclear burning. The British bomb designers used the terms "Tom" and "Dick" for the bomb's primary and secondary stages respectively. The Tom would be a fission bomb. It would produce radiation to implode the Dick. Implicit in the creation of a hydrogen bomb was that it would be tested. Anthony Eden, who replaced Churchill as prime minister after the latter's retirement on 5 April 1955, gave a radio broadcast in which he declared: "You cannot prove a bomb until it has exploded. Nobody can know whether it is effective or not until it has been tested."

== Location ==
Preliminary testing of boosted fission weapons, in which the fission yield was increased ("boosted") through the addition of lithium-6 deuteride, was carried out in the Operation Mosaic tests in the Montebello Islands in May and June 1956. Orange Herald would also incorporate boosting. This was a sensitive matter; there was an agreement with Australia that no thermonuclear testing would be carried out there. The Australian Minister for Supply, Howard Beale, responding to rumours reported in the newspapers, asserted that "the Federal Government has no intention of allowing any hydrogen bomb tests to take place in Australia. Nor has it any intention of allowing any experiments connected with hydrogen bomb tests to take place here." Although the devices tested in Mosaic were not thermonuclear, the tests were connected with hydrogen bomb development, so this prompted Eden to cable the Prime Minister of Australia, Robert Menzies, detailing the nature and purpose of the tests. Eden promised that the yield of the second, larger test would not exceed two and a half times that of the Operation Hurricane test, which was 25 kilotonnes of TNT (100 TJ). This was slightly higher than the 50 kilotonnes of TNT (210 TJ) limit previously agreed on tests in Australia. Menzies cabled his approval of the tests on 20 June 1955. In the event, the yield of the second test was 60 kilotonnes of TNT (250 TJ).

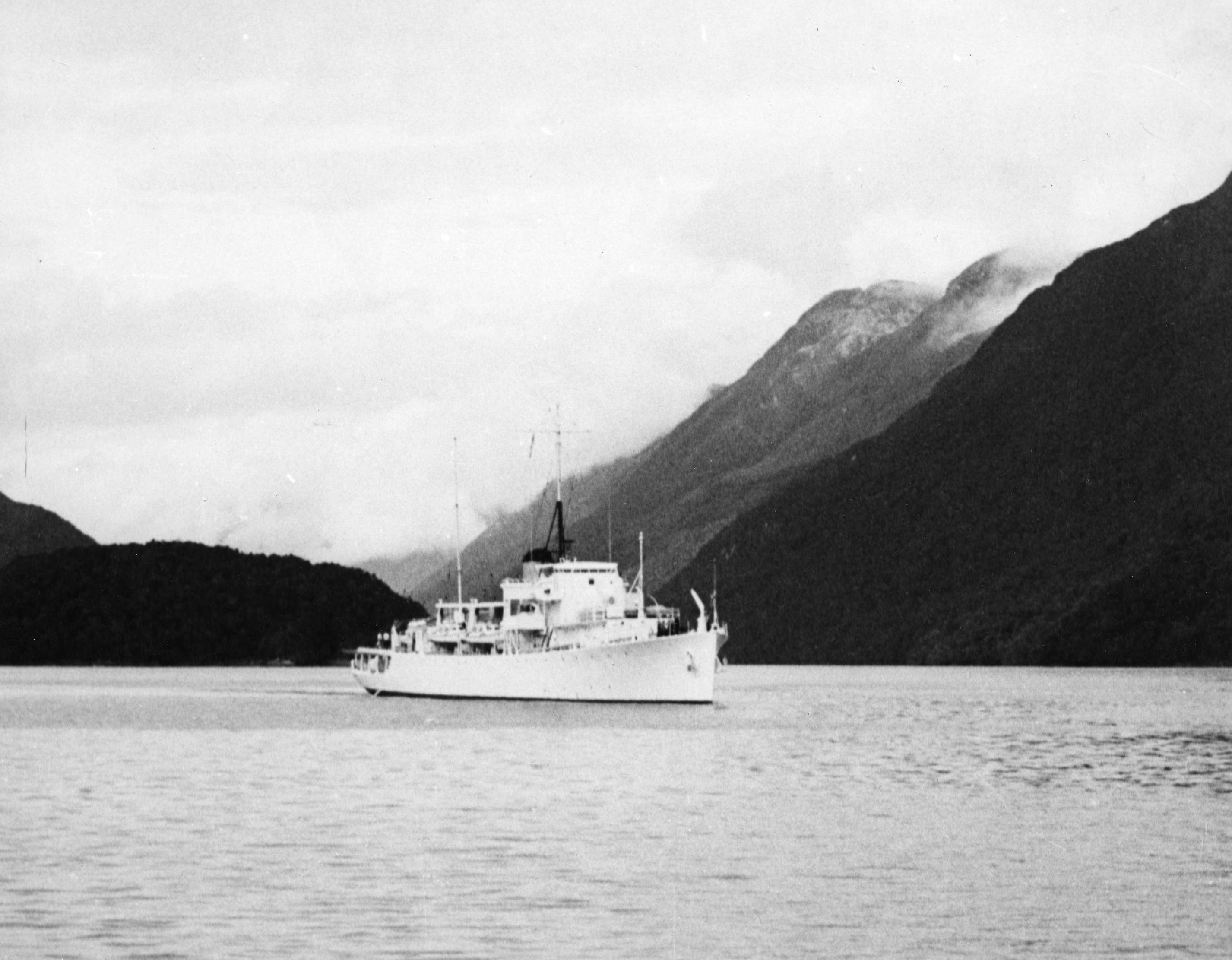
The survey ship HMNZS Lachlan

Another test site was therefore required. For safety and security reasons, in the light of the Lucky Dragon incident, in which the crew of a Japanese fishing boat were exposed to radioactive fallout from the American Castle Bravo nuclear test, a large site remote from population centres was required. Various islands in the South Pacific and Southern Oceans were considered, along with Antarctica. The Admiralty suggested the Antipodes Islands, which are about 860 kilometres (530 mi) southeast of New Zealand. In May 1955, the Minister for Defence, Selwyn Lloyd, concluded that the Kermadec Islands, which lie about 1,000 kilometres (620 mi) northeast of New Zealand, would be suitable.

The Kermadec Islands were part of New Zealand, so Eden wrote to the Prime Minister of New Zealand, Sidney Holland, to ask for permission to use the islands. Holland refused, fearing an adverse public reaction in the upcoming 1957 general election in New Zealand. Despite reassurances and pressure from the British government, Holland remained firm. The search for a location continued, with Malden Island and McKean Island being considered. These were uninhabited islands claimed by both Britain and the United States. The former island became the frontrunner. Three Avro Shackletons from No. 240 Squadron were sent to conduct an aerial reconnaissance from Canton Island. It too was claimed by both the United States and Britain, and was jointly administered, so the Americans had to be informed. Holland agreed to send the survey ship HMNZS Lachlan to conduct a maritime survey.

Kiritimati (Christmas Island) was chosen as a base. It too was claimed by both Britain and the United States. Lying just north of the equator, it was a tropical island, largely covered in grass, scrub and coconut plantations. Temperatures were high, averaging 88 °F (31 °C) during the day and 78 °F (26 °C) at night, and humidity was very high, usually around 98 per cent. It lay 1,450 miles (2,330 km) from Tahiti, 1,335 miles (2,148 km) from Honolulu, 3,250 miles (5,230 km) from San Francisco and 4,000 miles (6,400 km) from Sydney. Its remoteness would dominate the logistic preparations for Operation Grapple. It had no indigenous population, but about 260 Gilbertese civilians lived on the island, in a village near Port London. They came from the Gilbert and Ellice Islands, and worked the coconut plantations to produce copra. While most only stayed for a year or two, some had been on the island for a decade or more. Although Christmas Island was the main base, the area around Malden Island 400 nautical miles (740 km) to the south was to be the site for the air-dropped tests, and Penrhyn Island, 200 nautical miles (370 km) farther south was used as a technical monitoring site and as a weather station. A United States Air Force (USAF) special weapons monitoring team was based there, and the airstrip was improved to allow its supporting Douglas C-124 Globemaster II to use it.

South Pacific Air Lines (SPAL) had been granted permission by the United States and British governments to operate a flying boat service from Christmas Island. Patrick Dean asked the British Ambassador to the United States, Sir Roger Makins, to sound out the US government about terminating the contract. Makins reported in March 1956 that Admiral Arthur W. Radford, the Chairman of the Joint Chiefs of Staff, was willing to help so long as the dormant American claim to the island was not prejudiced. The lease on the island facilities, including the airfield and the port, had been granted to SPAL with a clause in the contract that said it could be terminated if there was a military necessity to do so. The Americans proposed that the British tell SPAL that they were establishing an airbase on the island, and that the United States would support this so long as SPAL was paid fair compensation. An official letter was sent to the president of SPAL on 1 May 1956, withdrawing the permit to operate from Christmas Island, regretting any inconvenience, and offering to consider compensation.

== Preparations ==
=== Organisation ===
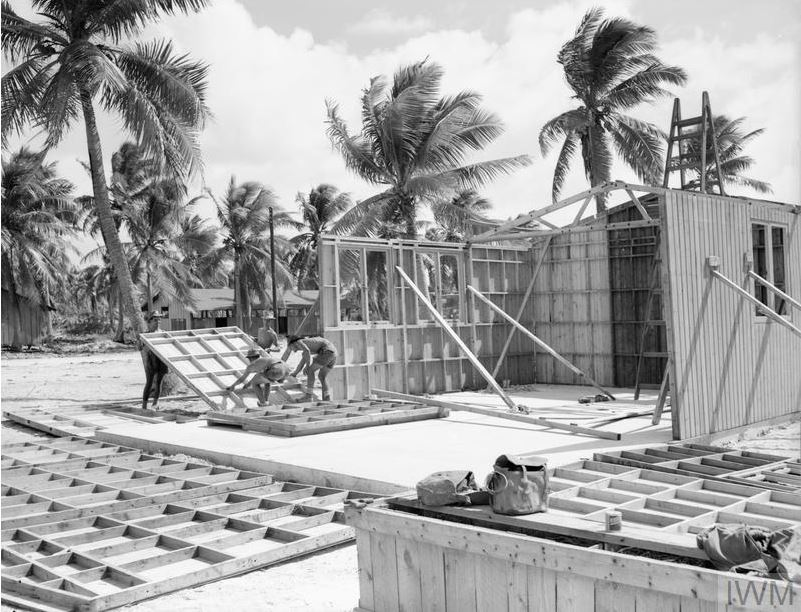
Royal Engineers assemble huts on Christmas Island

The test series was given the secret codename Operation Grapple. Rear Admiral Kaye Edden, the Commandant of the Joint Services Staff College, was approached to be the Task Force Commander (TFC), but he pointed out that the test series would primarily be a Royal Air Force (RAF) responsibility, and that it would be more appropriate to have an RAF officer in charge. Air Commodore Wilfrid Oulton was appointed task force commander on 6 February 1956, with the acting rank of air vice marshal from 1 March 1956. He secured Group Captain Richard Gething as his chief of staff.

Group Captain Cecil (Ginger) Weir was appointed Air Task Group Commander. RAF units assigned to Grapple included two English Electric Canberra bomber squadrons, Nos. 76 (the Nuclear Cloud Samplers) and 100; two Shackleton squadrons, Nos. 206 and 240; the Vickers Valiant bombers of No. 49 Squadron; a flight of search and rescue Westland Whirlwind helicopters of No. 22 Squadron; and No. 1325 Flight with three Dakota transport planes. All would come under the command of No. 160 Wing. Cook would be the scientific director. Oulton held the first meeting of the Grapple Executive Committee on New Oxford Street in London on 21 February 1956. With pressure mounting at home and abroad for a moratorium on testing, 1 April 1957 was set as the target date.

The light aircraft carrier HMS Warrior was the operation control ship, and the flagship of Commodore Peter Gretton, the overall Naval Task Group commander. She embarked three Grumman TBF Avenger attack aircraft and four Royal Navy Whirlwind helicopters, along with two RAF Whirlwinds from No. 22 Squadron. Damage to the ship caused by a storm in the North Atlantic necessitated two days' of repairs in Kingston, Jamaica. By the time they were complete, there was insufficient time to sail around Cape Horn, so she traversed the Panama Canal, negotiating the narrowest part of the locks with just inches to spare. HMS Narvik reprised the role of control ship it had in Hurricane; but it also participated in Operation Mosaic, and had very little time to return to the Chatham Dockyard for a refit before heading out to Christmas Island for Grapple. In addition there were the frigates HMS Alert and HMS Cook, and Royal New Zealand Navy frigates HMNZS Pukaki and Rotoiti.

=== Base development ===
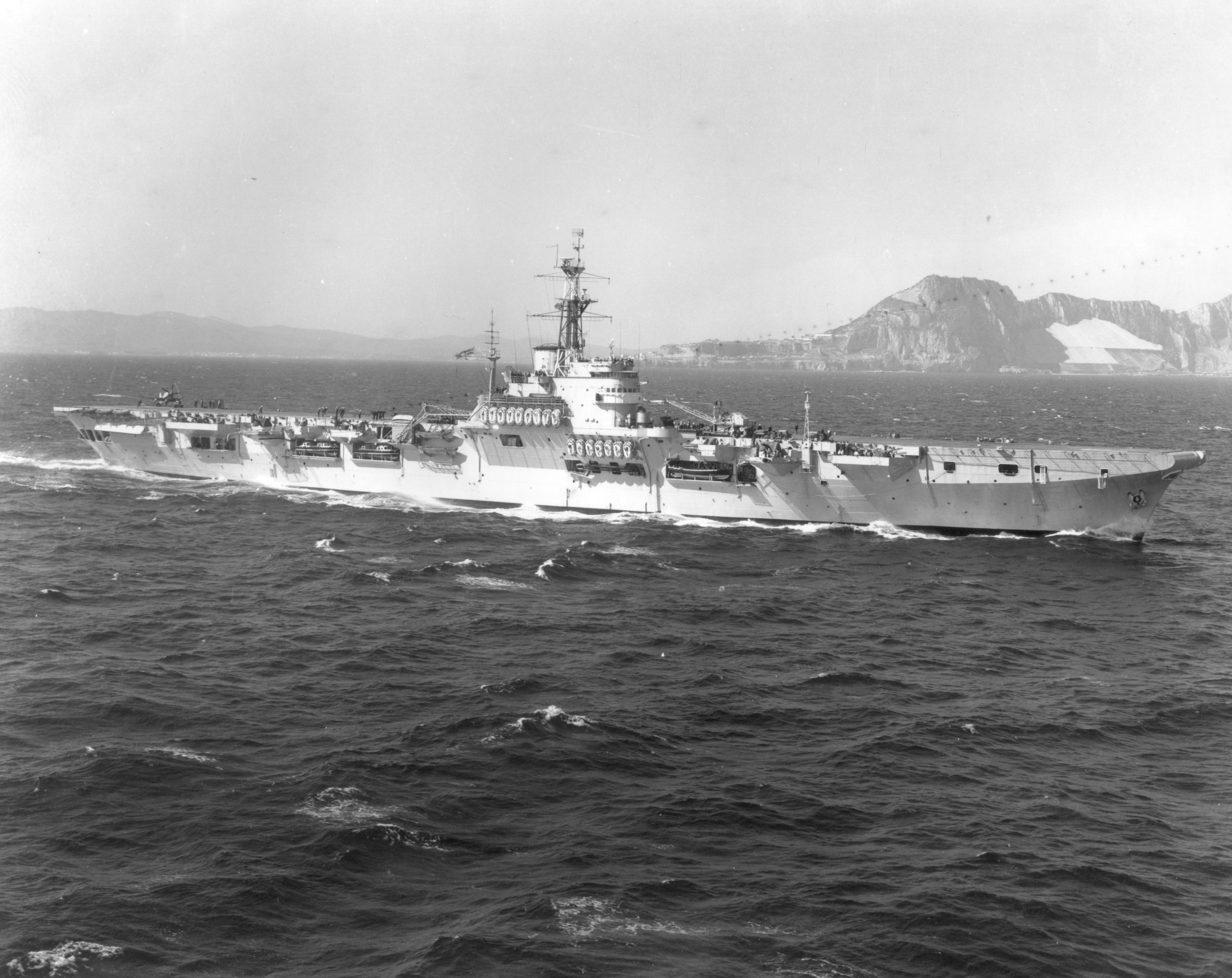
HMS Warrior, a Colossus-class light aircraft carrier, was the headquarters ship for Britain's atom hydrogen tests on Christmas Island.

An advance party arrived on Christmas Island in an RAF Shackleton on 19 June 1956. The Royal Fleet Auxiliary (RFA) supply ship Fort Beauharnois followed on 23 June, and became a temporary headquarters ship. It was ultimately joined by four more RFAs: the supply ship RFA Fort Constantine, ammunition ship Fort Rosalie, and tankers Gold Ranger and Wave Prince. The role of headquarters ship was assumed by the Landing Ship, Tank (LST) HMS Messina, which arrived on 7 December 1956. She was fitted out with special radio equipment to contact the United Kingdom. She carried large refrigerators on her tank deck for storage of fresh and frozen produce, and could supply 100 long tons (100 t) of potable water per day.

Narvik would have to spend long periods of time at Malden, but could not anchor there because of the steep grade of the ocean floor, so a deep-water mooring was desirable. Warrior needed one at Christmas Island, and moorings equipped with ship-to-shore telephones would be useful for the supply ships. Moorings were usually laid by boom defence vessels, but all the Royal Navy's ones were coal burners, and they lacked the range to sail all the way to Christmas Island. An ocean-going salvage vessel, was acquired and commissioned as Salvictor. It was sent to the Chatham Dockyard, where it was fitted with launching ramps for mooring chains and buoys, and its quarterdeck was modified to carry a DUKW, an amphibious truck.

The RAF and Royal Engineers improved the airfield to enable it to operate large, heavily loaded aircraft, and the port and facilities were improved to enable Christmas Island to operate as a base by 1 December 1956. It was estimated that 18,640 measurement tons (21,110 m^{3}) of stores would be required for the construction effort alone. A dredge to clear the harbour was towed from Australia. Base development included improvements to the road system, and establishing an electricity supply, fresh water distillation plant, sewerage system and cold storage. The population of the island would peak at 3,000. The Army Task Group was commanded by Colonel J. E. S. (Jack) Stone; Colonel John Woollett was the garrison commander.

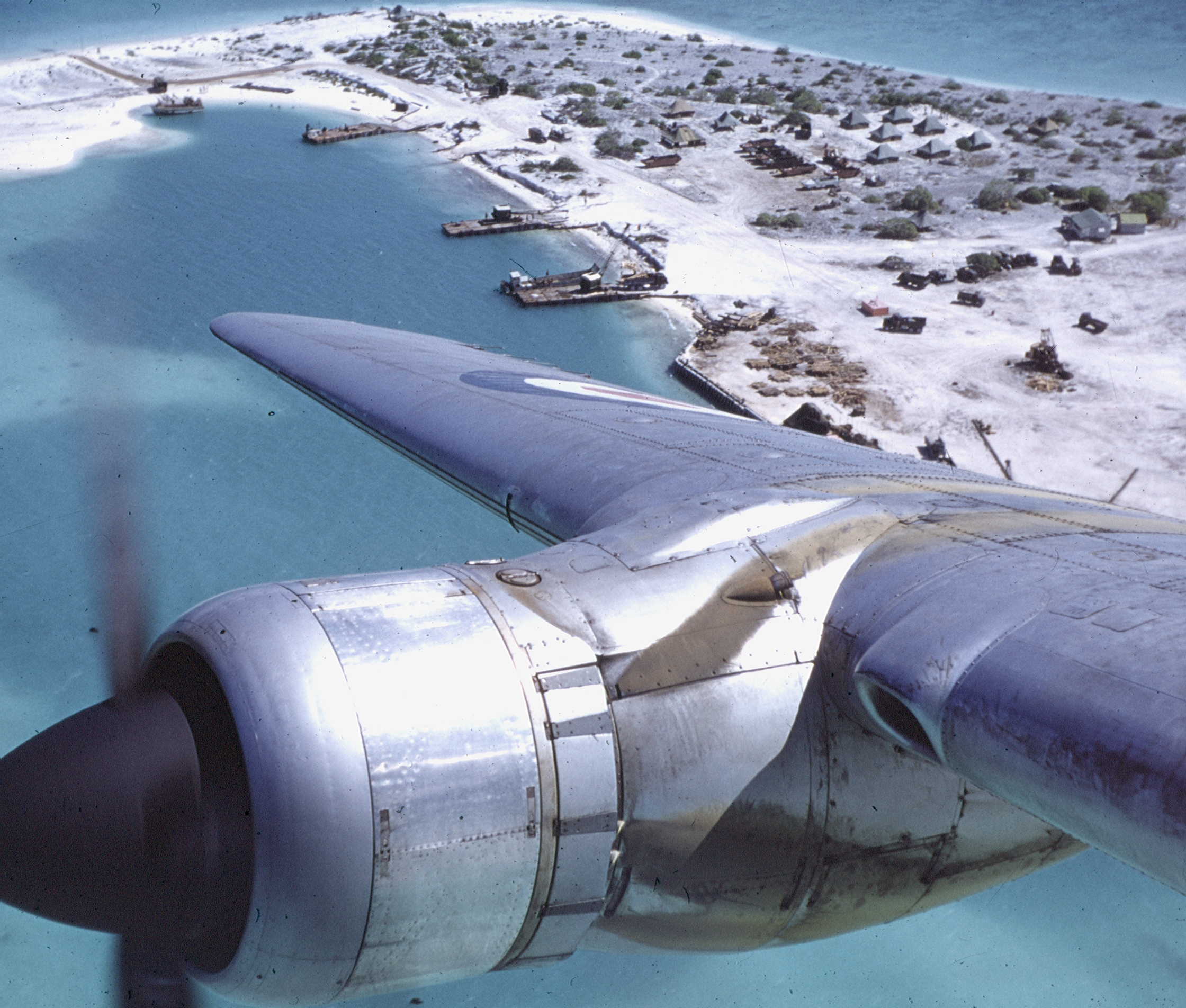
View from an RAF Handley Page Hastings transport flying over Christmas Island in August 1956.

The construction force was built around 38 Corps Engineer Regiment, with the 48, 59 and 61 Field Squadrons, and 63 Field Park Squadron, and 12 and 73 Independent Field Squadrons. Part of the 25 Engineer Regiment also deployed. They were augmented by two construction troops from the Fiji Defence Force. With work on the plantations halted for the duration of Operation Grapple, the Gilbertese civilians were also employed on construction works and unloading the barges.

The troopship SS Devonshire sailed to the Central Pacific from East Asia. At Singapore she embarked 55 Field Squadron, which came from Korea, having been left behind there when the rest of 28 Engineer Regiment had returned to England after supporting the 1st Commonwealth Division in the Korean War. It also embarked Royal Marines Landing Craft Mechanized (LCM) crews from Poole. Heavy engineering plant and equipment was loaded on the SS Reginald Kerr, an LST converted to civilian use. Devonshire docked in Fiji, where it took on some sappers who had flown ahead, and an RAF medical team. Devonshire reached Christmas Island on 24 December, followed by Reginald Kerr, with Woollett on board. By the end of December 1956, there were nearly 4,000 personnel on Christmas Island, including two women from the Women's Voluntary Services.

The first project, which was finished in October, was to rebuild the main runway at the airport to handle Valiants. This involved levelling a surface to extend it to 2,150 yards (1,970 m) long and 60 yards (55 m) wide. Some 20 miles (32 km) of access roads were built, and 700,000 square yards (590,000 m^{2}) of scrub were cleared. Existing buildings were refurbished, and new ones erected to provided 7,000 square yards (5,900 m^{2}) of building space. Twelve 105,000-imperial-gallon (480,000 L) storage tanks were provided for petrol, diesel and aviation fuel, along with pumping stations.

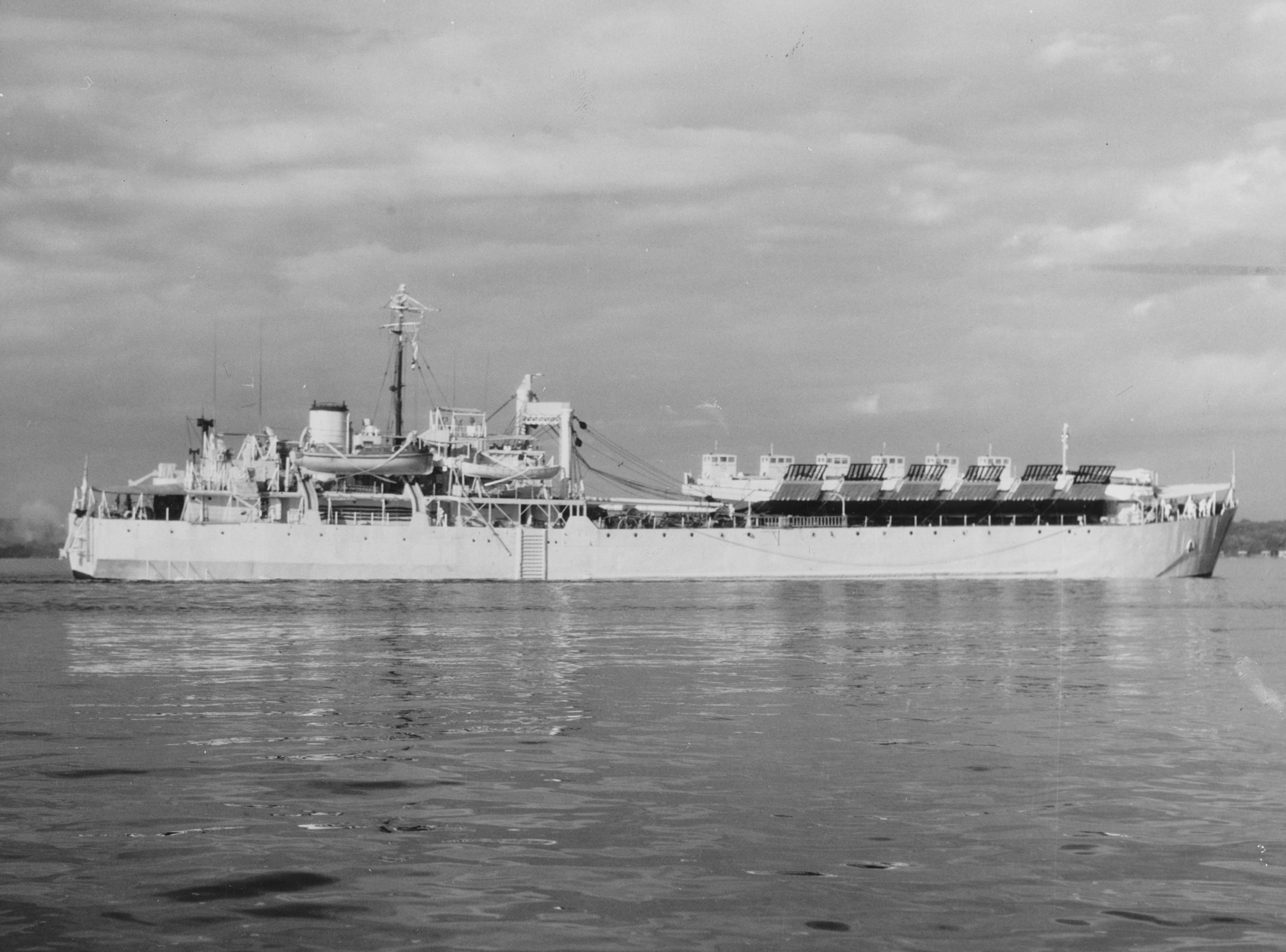
HMS Messina, the headquarters and communications ship for Operation Grapple

The main camp consisted of over 700 tents and marquees, along with 40,000 square feet (3,700 m^{2}) of hutted accommodation. The airbase was ready to accommodate the Valiants and their crews by March 1957. The port was managed by 51 Port Detachment. No. 504 Postal Unit, which had a detachment at Hickam Air Force Base, a USAF base in the American Territory of Hawaii, handled the receipt and despatch of mail, while No. 2 Special Air Formation Signal Troop provided communications support. The Royal Army Service Corps provided a butchery, a bakery and a laundry. They also operated DUKWs, which worked alongside the LCMs.

The Task Force received generous support from the United States Army, Navy and Air Force. RAF aircraft were allowed to overfly the United States, even when carrying radioactive or explosive materials, thereby obviating the need for winterisation for the more northerly journey over Canada. RAF ground crews were accommodated at Hickham and Travis Air Force Base in California, and a regular aerial courier service operated from Hickham to Christmas Island. Warrior had repairs made at Pearl Harbor, and the US Army base at Fort DeRussy gave Woollett use of its facilities.

About 60 Gilbertese civilians were relocated to Fanning Island in January 1957 on the copra ship Tungaru, and another 40 on the Tulgai the following month. By mid-March, 44 Gilbertese men, 29 women and 56 children remained. By the end of April, 31 of the men, and all the women and children had been taken to Fanning Island by RAF Handley Page Hastings aircraft. The civilians would remain there for the next three months, before returning to Christmas Island. During the later test series, the Gilbertese civilians remained on the island, marshalled in areas like the military personnel.

=== Schedule ===
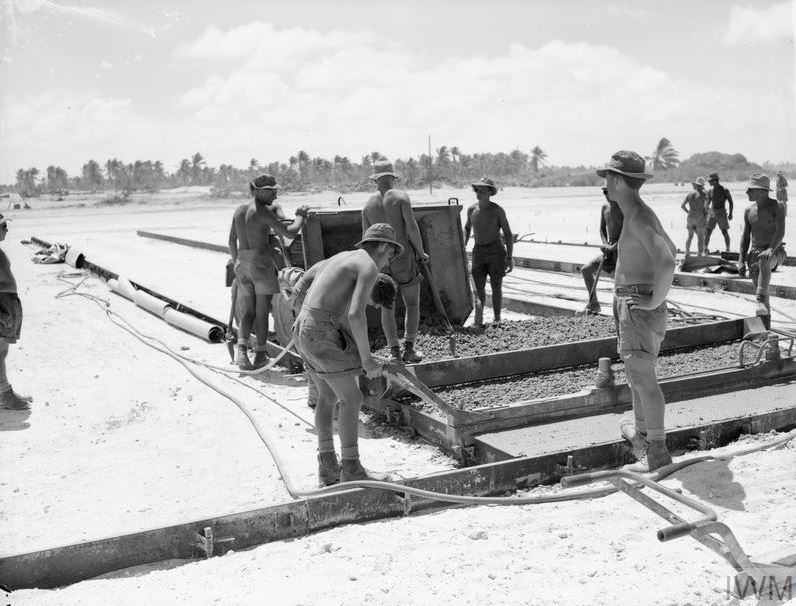
Royal Engineers construct the airfield runway.

Having decided on a location and date, there remained the matter of determining what would be tested. John Challens, whose weapons electronics group at Aldermaston had to produce the bomb assembly, wanted to know the configuration of Green Granite. Cook ruled that it would use a Red Beard Tom, and would fit inside a Blue Danube casing for air dropping. The design was frozen in April 1956. There were two versions of Orange Herald, large and small. They had similar cores, but the large version contained more explosive. Both designs were frozen in July. The Green Bamboo design was also nominally frozen, but minor adjustments continued. On 3 September, John Corner suggested that Green Granite could be made smaller by moving the Tom and Dick closer together. This design became known as Short Granite.

By January 1957, with the tests just months away, a tentative schedule had emerged. Short Granite would be fired first. Green Bamboo would follow if Short Granite was unsuccessful, but be omitted as unnecessary otherwise. Orange Herald (small) would be fired next. Because Short Granite was too large to fit into a missile or guided bomb, this would occur whether or not Short Granite was a success. Finally, Green Granite would be tested. In December 1956, Cook had proposed another design, known as Green Granite II. This was smaller than Green Granite I, and could fit into a Yellow Sun casing that could be used by the Blue Steel guided missile then under development; but it could not be made ready to reach Christmas Island before 26 June 1957, and extending Operation Grapple would cost another £1.5 million (equivalent to £43 million in 2024).

== Testing ==
=== Grapple series (3 tests) ===
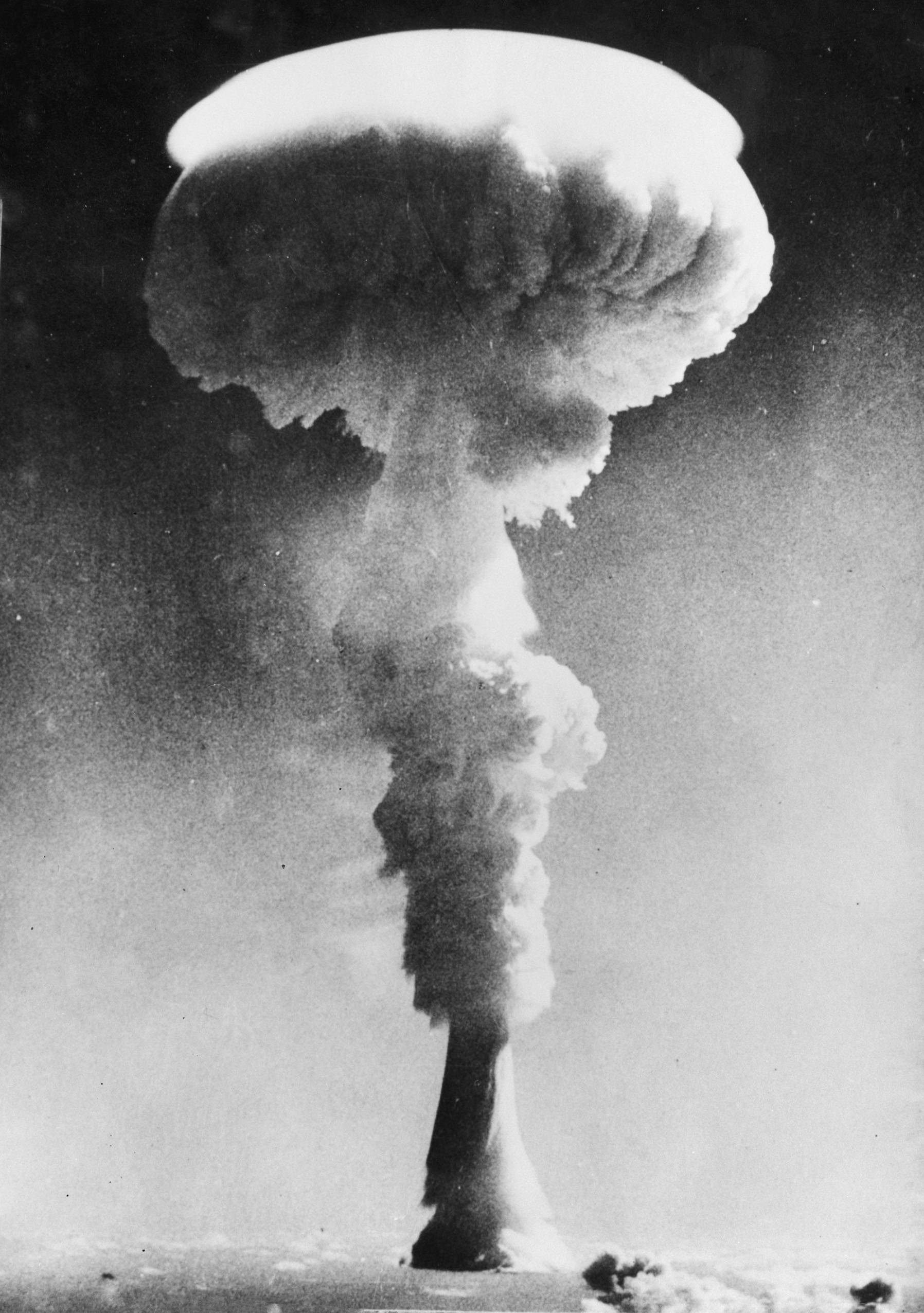
Grapple 1 test in May 1957. Hailed as Britain's first hydrogen bomb test, it was in fact a failure.

The first trial series consisted of three tests, named Grapple 1, Grapple 2 and Grapple 3. All bombs were dropped and detonated over Malden Island, and exploded high in the atmosphere, rather than being detonated on the ground, in order to reduce the production of nuclear fallout. British scientists were aware that the Americans had been able to reduce fallout by obtaining most of the bomb yield from fusion instead of fission, but they did not yet know how to do this. Amid growing public concern about the dangers of fallout, particularly from strontium-90 entering the food chain, a committee chaired by Sir Harold Himsworth was asked to look into the matter. Another, in the United States chaired by Detlev Bronk, also investigated. They reported simultaneously on 12 June 1956. While differing on many points, they agreed that levels of strontium-90 were not yet sufficiently high to be of concern.

At an altitude of 8,000 feet (2,400 m), the fireball would not touch the ground, thereby minimising fallout. The bombs would be detonated with a clockwork timer rather than a barometric switch. This meant that they had to be dropped from 45,000 feet (14,000 m) in order to detonate at the correct altitude. Grapple was Britain's second airdrop of a nuclear bomb after the Operation Buffalo test at Maralinga on 11 October 1956, and the first of a thermonuclear weapon. The United States had not attempted this until the Operation Redwing Cherokee test on 21 May 1956, and the bomb had landed 4 miles (6.4 km) from the target. Aldermaston wanted the bomb within 300 yards (270 m) of the target, and Oulton felt that a good bomber crew could achieve that. A 550-by-600-nautical-mile (1,020 by 1,110 km) exclusion zone was established, covering the area between 3.5° North and 7.5° South and 154° and 163° West, which was patrolled by Shackletons.

No. 49 Squadron had eight Valiants, but only four deployed: XD818, piloted by Wing Commander Kenneth Hubbard, the squadron commander; XD822, piloted by Squadron Leader L. D. (Dave) Roberts; XD823, piloted by Squadron Leader Arthur Steele; and XD824, piloted by Squadron Leader Barney Millett. The other four Valiants remained at RAF Wittering, where they were used as courier aircraft for bomb components. The last components for Short Granite were delivered by Valiant courier on 10 May 1957—three days late owing to severe head winds between San Francisco and Honolulu. A full-scale rehearsal was held on 11 May, and on 14 May it was decided to conduct the Grapple 1 test the following day. The eight official observers—two each from Australia, Canada, New Zealand and the United States—were flown from Honolulu to Christmas Island in an RAF Hastings, then to Malden Island in a Dakota, from whence a DUKW took them out to HMS Alert, the spectator ship. All but a small party were evacuated from Malden by HMS Warrior, Narvik and Messina by 19:00 on 14 May. The rest were picked up by a helicopter from Warrior at 07:45 on 15 May. Oulton and Cook arrived on Malden by Dakota at 08:25, where they were met by a helicopter and taken to Narvik.

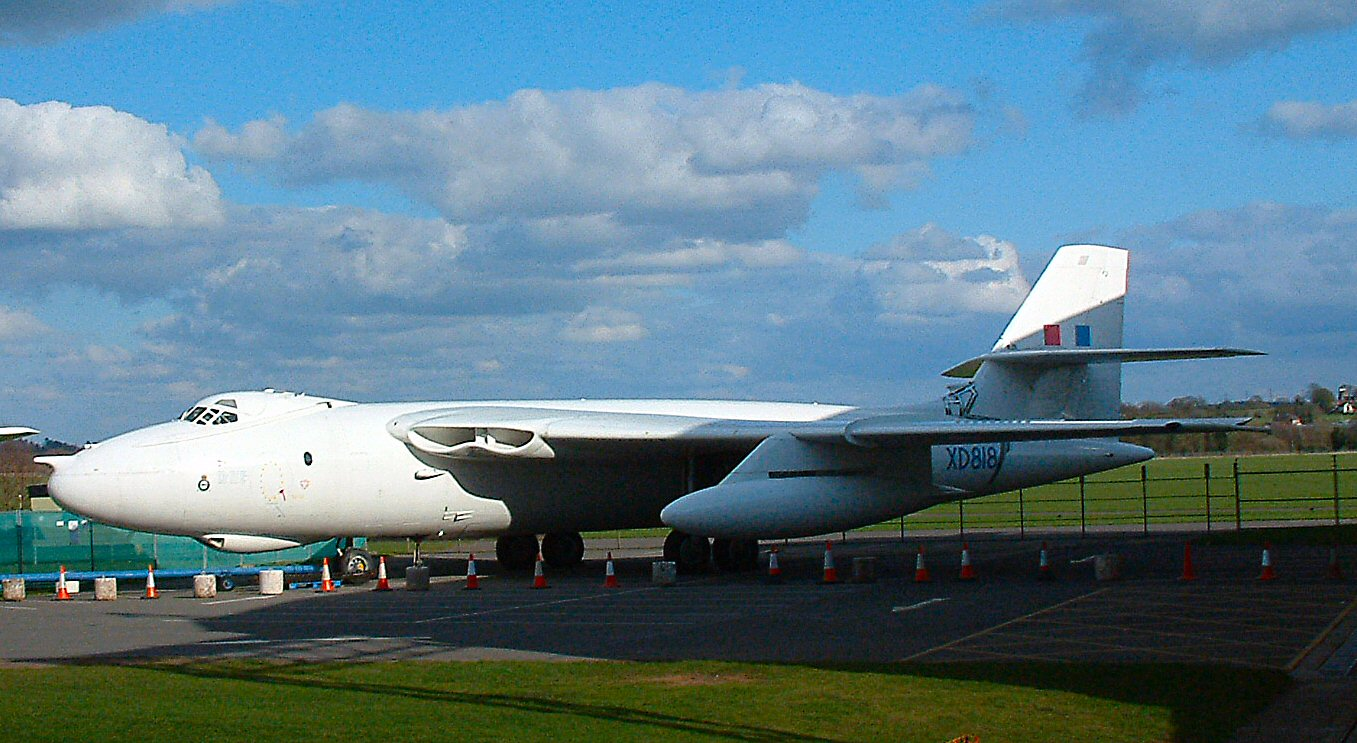
Vickers Valiant B1 XD818 at Royal Air Force Museum Midlands

The Grapple 1 mission was flown by Hubbard in XD818, with Millett and XD824 as the "grandstand" observation aircraft. The two bombers took off from Christmas Island at 09:00. The bomb was dropped from 45,000 feet (14,000 m) off the shore of Malden Island at 10:38 local time on 15 May 1957. Hubbard put the bomb 418 yards (382 m) from the target. The bomb's yield was estimated at 300 kilotonnes of TNT (1,300 TJ), far below its designed capability. Penney cancelled the Green Granite test and substituted a new weapon codenamed Purple Granite. This was identical to Short Granite, but with some minor modification to its Dick: additional uranium-235 was added, and the outer layer was replaced with aluminium.

Despite its failure, the Grapple 1 test was hailed as a successful thermonuclear explosion, and the government did not confirm or deny reports that the UK had become a third thermonuclear power. When documents on the series began to be declassified in the 1990s, they created a spirited debate among nuclear historians. Norman Dombey and Eric Grove denounced the Grapple tests in the London Review of Books in 1992 as a hoax intended to deceive the Americans into resuming nuclear cooperation, but others, like the British nuclear weapons historian John Bayliss, pointed out that false reports would not have fooled the American observers, who helped to analyse samples from the radioactive cloud.

The Grapple 2 test on 31 May 1957 of Orange Herald, as reported by Universal International Newsreel

The next test was Grapple 2, of Orange Herald (small). For this test, two Fijian official observers were added. A detachment of 39 Fijian Royal Navy Volunteer Reserve ratings who had been on board RNZN Pukaki and Roititi was transferred to HMS Warrior. This time there were also media representatives present on HMS Alert, including Chapman Pincher and William Connor. Orange Herald bomb components arrived in three separate loads on 13 May. Assembling them took two weeks.

The bomb was dropped by XD822, piloted by Roberts, while XD823, piloted by Steele, acted as the grandstand aircraft. This bomb was dropped at 10:44 local time on 31 May. After the bomb was released, Roberts made the standard 60° banked turn to get away, but his accelerometer failed, and the aircraft went into a high speed stall. This was potentially disastrous, but through skilful flying Roberts was able to recover from the stall and use the mechanical accelerometer to complete the manoeuvre.

The 720-to-800-kilotonne-of-TNT (3,000 to 3,300 TJ) yield was the largest ever achieved by a single stage device. This made it technically a megaton-range weapon; but it was close to Corner's estimate for an unboosted yield, and there were doubts that the lithium-6 deuteride had contributed at all. This was attributed to Rayleigh–Taylor instability, which limited the compression of the light elements in the core. The bomb was hailed as a hydrogen bomb, and the fact that it was actually a large fission bomb was kept secret by the British government until the end of the Cold War.

The third and final test of the series was Grapple 3, the test of Purple Granite. This was dropped on 19 June by a Valiant XD823 piloted by Steele, with Millett and XD824 as the grandstand aircraft. The yield was a very disappointing 200 kilotonnes of TNT (840 TJ), even less than Short Granite. The changes had not worked. "We haven't got it right", Cook told Oulton. "We shall have to do it all again, providing we can do so before the ban comes into force; so that means as soon as possible."

=== Grapple X (1 test) ===
The next test series consisted of a single trial known as Grapple X. To save time and money, and as HMS Warrior, Alert, and Narvik were unavailable, it was decided to drop the bomb off the southern tip of Christmas Island rather than off Malden Island. This was just 20 nautical miles (37 km; 23 mi) from the airfield where 3,000 men were based. It required another major construction effort to improve the facilities, and some of those on Malden Island now had to be duplicated on Christmas Island. Works included 26 blast-proof shelters, a control room, and tented accommodation. To provide some means of chasing away intruders, the destroyer HMS Cossack was allotted. HMNZS Rotoiti and Pukaki reprised their role as weather ships. A cargo ship, the SS Somersby was chartered to bring tentage and stores to Christmas Island. Monitoring equipment was set up on Malden Island and Fanning Island, and the observation posts on Penrhyn Island and Jarvis Island were re-established. Oulton noticed that:

[T]he rumour had gone around the force that there were to be further tests and that they would have to remain much longer on Christmas. This was apparently confirmed by the preparations to build the air strip in the south of the island. The cheerful put-up-with-the-snags-and-get-on-with-this-important-job attitude of all ranks was changing to a sullen resentment. The troops of all three services had had a pretty miserable time, despite all efforts to the contrary, but had been buoyed up by the belief that the task was of great national importance and the sooner they got the three tests done, the sooner they could go home.

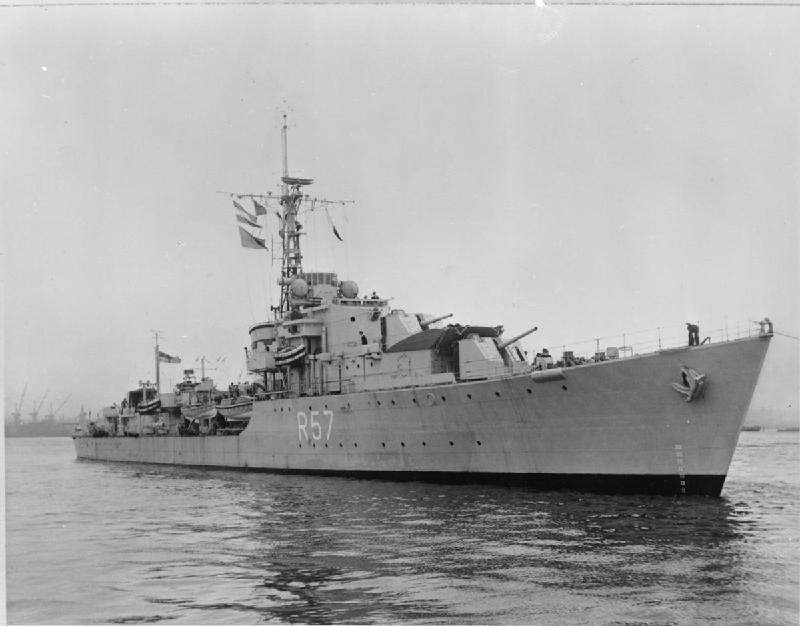
The destroyer HMS Cossack

While some ships and units such as No. 49 Squadron returned to the UK, most personnel had to remain on Christmas Island. The Minister of Supply gave assurances that no personnel would have to remain on the island for more than a year unless absolutely necessary, in which case home leave would be given. To maintain morale, units were given periodic briefings on the importance of their work. Junior officers took a keen interest in the welfare of the men and their families at home, since they were not permitted to bring them to the island. An efficient mail system was maintained to allow them to keep in contact. The quality of Army rations was better than at any other British base. The men were given one day a week off work, and sports such as football, cricket, tennis, volleyball, sailing, fishing and water skiing were organised. Leave was provided that could be taken in Fiji, Hawaii or the Gilbert Islands. To relieve the monotony, some Army personnel ashore exchanged places with some Navy personnel afloat. A Christmas Island Broadcasting Service was established with nightly radio programmes.

The scientists at Aldermaston had not yet mastered the design of thermonuclear weapons. Knowing that much of the yield of American and Soviet bombs came from fission in the uranium-238 tamper, they had focused on what they called the "lithium-uranium cycle", whereby neutrons from the fission of uranium would trigger fusion, which would produce more neutrons to induce fission in the tamper. However, this is not the most important reaction. Corner and his theoretical physicists at Aldermaston argued that Green Granite could be made to work by increasing compression and reducing Rayleigh–Taylor instability. The first step would be achieved with an improved Tom. The Red Beard Tom was given an improved high explosive supercharge, a composite uranium-235 and plutonium core, and a beryllium tamper, thereby increasing its yield to 45 kilotonnes of TNT (190 TJ). The Dick was greatly simplified; instead of the fourteen layers in Short Granite, it would have just three. This was called Round A; a five-layer version was also mooted, which was called Round B. A diagnostic round, Round C, was also produced. It had the same three layers as Round A, but an inert layer instead of lithium deuteride. Grapple X would test Round A. Components of Rounds A and C were delivered to Christmas Island on 24, 27 and 29 October. On inspection, a fault was found in the Round A Tom, and the fissile core was replaced with the one from Round C.

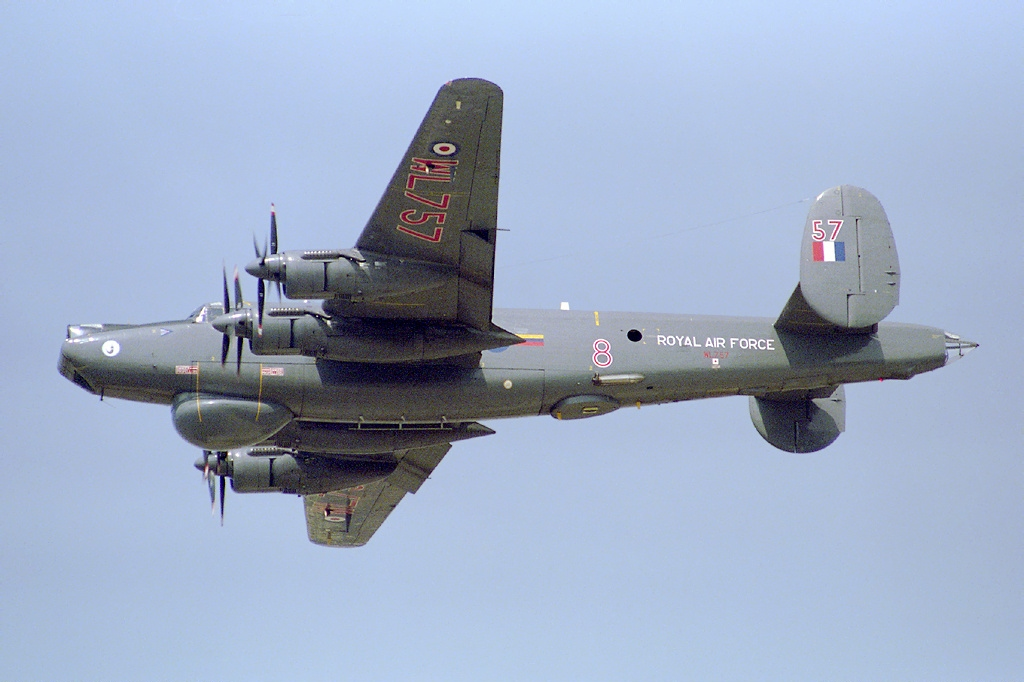
An Avro Shackleton

This time there was no media presence, and only two foreign observers, Rear Admiral G. S. Patrick, the Director of the Atomic Energy Division in the Office of the Chief of Naval Operations from the US Navy, and Brigadier General John. W. White, the Deputy Chief of the Armed Forces Special Weapons Project, from the USAF. As the final preparations were being made for the test on 8 November, Oulton was advised at 01:00 that a Shackleton had sighted the SS Effie, an old Victory ship now flying the Liberian flag, in the exclusion zone. Eager to minimise publicity before this test, the British government had delayed sending out the Notice to Mariners, which had only been issued three weeks before. This failed to take into account the size of the Pacific Ocean; Effie had left its last port of call before it had been issued. The Shackleton kept Effie under observation while trying to contact her, and Cossack was sent to intercept. By 06:00, all was in readiness for the test, but there was no news of Effie. Finally, at 06:15, word was received from the Shackleton that the crew had woken up and Effie had turned about and was now headed due south, out of the exclusion zone at 12 knots (22 km/h). A report from the Shackleton at 07:25 indicated that Effie was now sailing in company with Cossack.

By this time the Valiants had started their engines; they took off at 07:35, and were on the way when Cossack reported that Effie had cleared the area. The bomb was dropped from Valiant XD824, piloted by Millett, at 08:47 on 8 November 1957; Flight Lieutenant R. Bates flew the grandstand Valiant XD825. This time the yield of 1.8 megatonnes of TNT (7.53 PJ) exceeded expectations; the predicted yield had only been 1 megatonne of TNT (4.18 PJ), but it was still below the 2 megatonnes of TNT (8.37 PJ) safety limit. This was the real hydrogen bomb Britain wanted, but it used a relatively large quantity of expensive highly enriched uranium. Due to the higher-than-expected yield of the explosion, there was some damage to buildings, the fuel storage tanks, and helicopters on the island.

=== Grapple Y (1 test) ===
The physicists at Aldermaston had plenty of ideas about how to follow up Grapple X, and the possibilities were discussed in September 1957. One was to adjust the width of the shells in the Dick to find an optimal configuration. If they were too thick, they would slow the neutrons generated by the fusion reaction; if they were too thin, they would give rise to Rayleigh–Taylor instability. Another was to do away with the shells entirely and use a mixture of uranium-235, uranium-238 and deuterium. Ken Allen had an idea, which Samuel Curran supported, of a three-layer Dick that used a greater amount of lithium deuteride that was less enriched in lithium-6 (and therefore had more lithium-7) while reducing the amount of uranium-235 in the centre of the core. This proposal was adopted in October, and it became known as "Dickens" because it used Ken's Dick. The device would otherwise be similar to Round A, but with a larger radiation case. The safety limit was again set to 2 megatonnes of TNT (8.37 PJ). Keith Roberts calculated that the yield could reach 3 megatonnes of TNT (12.6 PJ), and suggested that this could be reduced by modifying the tamper, but Cook opposed this, fearing that it might cause the test to fail. The possibility of a moratorium on testing caused the plans for the test, codenamed Grapple Y, to be restricted to the Prime Minister, Harold Macmillan, who gave informal approval, and a handful of officials.

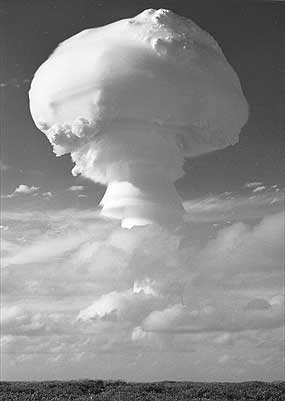
The Grapple Y test on 28 April 1958

The New Zealand National Party lost the 1957 election, and Walter Nash became prime minister. His New Zealand Labour Party had endorsed a call by the British Labour Party for a moratorium on nuclear testing, but he felt obligated to honour commitments made by his predecessors to support the British nuclear testing programme. However, HMNZS Rotoiti was unavailable, as it was joining the Far East Strategic Reserve; its place would be taken by the destroyer HMS Ulysses. Air Vice Marshal John Grandy succeeded Oulton as Task Force commander, and Air Commodore Jack Roulston became the Air Task Force Commander.

The bomb was dropped off Christmas Island at 10:05 local time on 28 April 1958 by a Valiant piloted by Squadron Leader Bob Bates. It had an explosive yield of about 3 megatonnes of TNT (12.6 PJ), and remains the largest British nuclear weapon ever tested. The design of Grapple Y was notably successful because much of its yield came from its thermonuclear reaction instead of fission of a heavy uranium-238 tamper, making it a true hydrogen bomb, and because its yield had been closely predicted—indicating that its designers understood what they were doing.

=== Grapple Z series (4 tests) ===
On 22 August 1958, US President Dwight D. Eisenhower announced a one-year moratorium on nuclear testing, effective 31 October 1958, if the Soviet Union and the United Kingdom also agreed to suspend testing. Britain had already indicated that it would do so, and the Soviet Union agreed on 30 August. This did not mean an immediate end to testing; on the contrary, all three rushed to perform as much testing as possible before the deadline. The British scientists needed to gather as much data as possible to allow them to design production nuclear weapons. As the prospect of increased American cooperation grew after October 1957, they knew that the quality and quantity of what the Americans would share would depend on what they had to offer. A new British test series, known as Grapple Z, commenced on 22 August. It explored new technologies such as the use of external neutron initiators, which had first been tried out with Orange Herald. Core boosting using tritium gas and external boosting with layers of lithium deuteride permitted a smaller, lighter Tom for two-stage devices. It would be the biggest and most complex British test series.

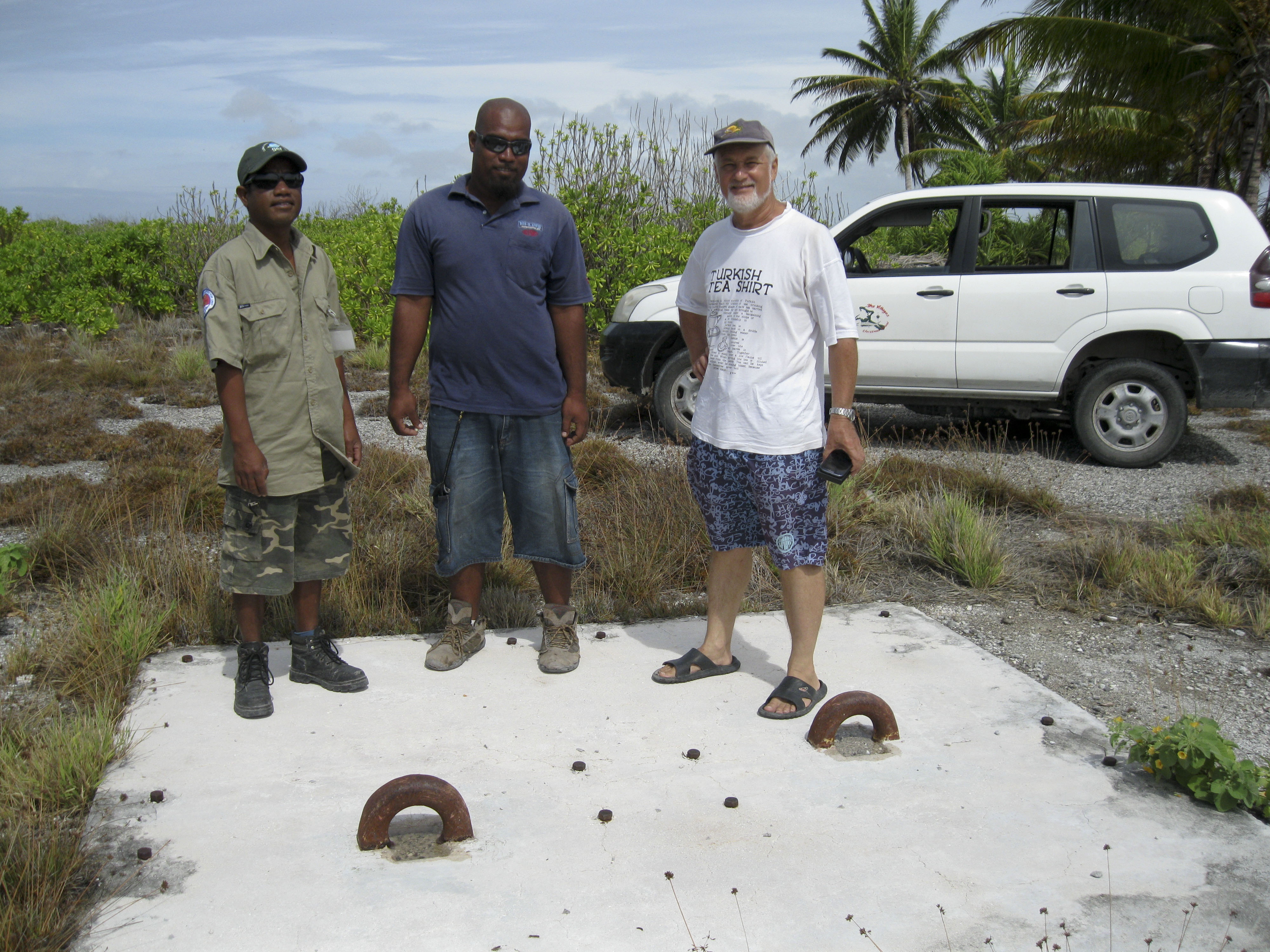
The East Point balloon anchor on Christmas Island. The bombs for Grapple Z1 and Z4 were hoisted by balloons from here.

Of particular concern was radiation damage. Keith Roberts and Bryan Taylor at Aldermaston had discovered that the flash of radiation from the detonation of an atomic bomb could affect a nearby bomb. This opened up the possibility of a missile warhead being disabled by another launched for this purpose. Plutonium cores were especially vulnerable, as they were already prone to predetonation. This had the potential to render Britain's nuclear deterrent ineffective. This discovery was given the highest level of secrecy, and Aldermaston would spend much of the next few years working on the problem. To build a primary immune to this effect would require techniques that Aldermaston had not yet mastered. The number of tests in the series was assumed to be four for planning purposes, but as late as May the Prime Minister had only approved two tests, tentatively scheduled for 15 August and 1 September 1958. Four Valiants, XD818, XD822, XD824 and XD827, deployed to Christmas Island, the last of which arrived on 31 July.

The first test was of Pendant, a fission bomb boosted with solid lithium hydride intended as a primary for a thermonuclear bomb. Rather than being dropped from a bomber, this bomb was suspended from a string of four vertically stacked barrage balloons. This was chosen over an air drop because the bomb assembly could not be fitted into a droppable casing, but it introduced a host of problems. A balloon test had been tried only once before by the British, during Operation Antler at Maralinga in October 1957. William Saxby from Aldermaston was placed in charge of the balloon crews, who commenced training at RAF Cardington in Bedfordshire in January 1958. Inflating the balloons required 1,200 cylinders of hydrogen gas, and there were no reserves. If another balloon test was required, then the empty cylinders would have to be returned to the United Kingdom for refilling, and then shipped out again. An important consideration was how they could be shot down if they broke loose of their moorings with a live nuclear bomb. The cargo ship SS Tidecrest arrived at Christmas Island on 20 July, but the firing harness was lost at San Francisco International Airport on 1 August, and a replacement had to be flown out. The Pendant fissile core arrived by air on 12 August, and the weapon was assembled with its external neutron initiator unit. On 22 August 1958 it was hoisted 1,500 feet (460 m) in the air over the south east corner of Christmas Island, and it detonated at 09:00. The yield was assessed at 24 kilotonnes of TNT (100 TJ).

The next test was of Flagpole, a scaled down version of the Grapple Y device with a small, unboosted primary known as Indigo Herald. It was air dropped by Valiant XD822, flown by Squadron Leader Bill Bailey, with XD818 flown by Flight Lieutenant Tiff O'Connor as the grandstand aircraft, on 2 September 1958. This was the first live drop of a British nuclear weapon using blind radar technique. This meant that the bomb would be dropped using radar rather than visually with the optical bombsight, a technique normally reserved for when a target is obscured by cloud or smoke. Bailey managed to place the bomb 95 yards (87 m) from the target. It detonated at 8,500 feet (2,600 m) about 2.5 kilometres (1.6 mi) offshore from South East Point on Christmas Island at 08:24 with a yield of about 1.2 megatonnes of TNT (5.02 PJ).

The third test was of Halliard, an unusual three-stage design with two nuclear-fission components followed by a thermonuclear stage that was supposedly immune to exposure from another bomb despite its not using boosting. The Americans had indicated an interest in it. Macmillan noted in his diary:

Meeting of atomic experts, just returned from US. Two important facts emerged: (a) Americans are doing ten more kiloton tests before the end of October and would not wish us to stop before them; (b) in some respects we are as far, and even further, advanced in the art than our American friends. They thought interchange of information would be all give. They are keen that we should complete our series, especially the last megaton, the character of which is novel and of deep interest to them. This is important, because it makes this final series complementary rather than competitive—and therefore easy to defend in Parliament.

The success of blind radar bombing in Flagpole led to Grandy deciding to use the technique again. Hubbard was less sure. The 95-yard (87 m) accuracy achieved in Flagpole was exceptional; in 52 practice drops with blind radar, the average error had been 235 yards (215 m) as opposed to 245 yards (224 m) with visual bombing. Thus it was only slightly more accurate, but the aircrew would be dropping a live hydrogen bomb—generally considered a dangerous thing to do—with no means of verifying that their instruments were correct. Air Chief Marshal Sir Harry Broadhurst, the head of Bomber Command, wished O'Connor luck; his XD827 would make the drop, with Squadron Leader Tony Caillard in XD827, the grandstand aircraft. The aircraft took off at 07:15 on 11 September 1958. Once in the air, a fault developed in the ground radar transmitter. Grandy then authorised a visual drop. It was later confirmed that it was 260 yards (240 m) from the target. It was detonated at 8,500 feet (2,600 m) about 2.5 kilometres (1.6 mi) offshore from South East Point on Christmas Island at 08:49 with a yield of about 800 kilotonnes of TNT (3,300 TJ), very close to the predicted yield of 750 kilotonnes of TNT (3,100 TJ).

The final test in the Grapple Z series was of Burgee, at 09:00 on 23 September 1958. This was another balloon-borne test detonated over the south east corner of Christmas Island. Burgee was an atomic bomb boosted with gaseous tritium created by a generator codenamed Daffodil. It had a yield of about 25 kilotonnes of TNT (100 TJ). The Aldermaston weapon makers had now demonstrated all of the technologies that were needed to produce a megaton hydrogen bomb that weighed no more than 1 long ton (1.0 t) and was immune to premature detonation caused by nearby nuclear explosions. The international moratorium commenced on 31 October 1958, and Britain never resumed atmospheric testing.

=== Summary ===
United Kingdom's Grapple series tests and detonations
Name	Date time (UTC)	Location	Height	Delivery	Device	Yield	Notes	References
Grapple 1	15 May 1957 19:37	Malden Island, Kiribati; 4.05°S 154.9°W	2,200 m (7,200 ft)	air drop	Short Granite	300 kilotonnes of TNT (1,260 TJ)	Attempted thermonuclear detonation, most of output from the secondary, but disappointing small yield overall.	
Grapple 2	31 May 1957 19:41	Malden Island, Kiribati; 4.05°S 154.9°W	2,400 m (7,900 ft)	air drop	Orange Herald	720 kilotonnes of TNT (3,010 TJ)	Largest fission (boosted) device ever tested, larger than the American Mark-18 S.O.B (largest pure fission bomb), which had an explosive yield of 500 kilotonnes.	
Grapple 3	19 June 1957 19:40	Malden Island, Kiribati; 4.05°S 154.9°W	2,400 m (7,900 ft)	air drop	Purple Granite	200 kilotonnes of TNT (837 TJ)	Attempt at fixing the Short Granite device, also unsuccessful.	
Grapple X	8 November 1957 17:47	Kiritimati (Christmas Island), Kiribati; 1.67851°N 157.23303°W	2,250 m (7,380 ft)	air drop	Round A	1.8 megatonnes of TNT (7.53 PJ)	First successful British thermonuclear bomb. Caused damage to buildings on Christmas island, some even caught fire.	
Grapple Y	28 April 1958 19:05	Kiritimati (Christmas Island), Kiribati; 1.6709°N 157.23726°W	2,350 m (7,710 ft)	air drop	Dickens	3 megatonnes of TNT (12.6 PJ)	Largest yield from a British thermonuclear device.	
Grapple Z1	22 August 1958 18:00	Kiritimati (Christmas Island), Kiribati; 1.72934°N 157.21065°W	450 m (1,480 ft)	balloon	Pennant	24 kilotonnes of TNT (100 TJ)	Use of a balloon, after shot Taranaki of Operation Antler successfully reduced fallout with the use of them.	
Grapple Z2	2 September 1958 17:24	Kiritimati (Christmas Island), Kiribati; 1.66932°N 157.22742°W	2,850 m (9,350 ft)	air drop	Flagpole	1,210 kilotonnes of TNT (5,060 TJ)		
Grapple Z3	11 September 1958 17:49	Kiritimati (Christmas Island), Kiribati; 1.65248°N 157.22374°W	2,650 m (8,690 ft)	air drop	Halliard	800 kilotonnes of TNT (3,350 TJ)	Chosen after American interest in novel design	
Grapple Z4	23 September 1958 18:00	Kiritimati (Christmas Island), Kiribati; 1.75194°N 157.18819°W	450 m (1,480 ft)	balloon	Burgee	25 kilotonnes of TNT (105 TJ)	Another shot atop a balloon, last atmospheric nuclear test by Britain.	

== Aftermath ==
=== Cooperation with the United States ===
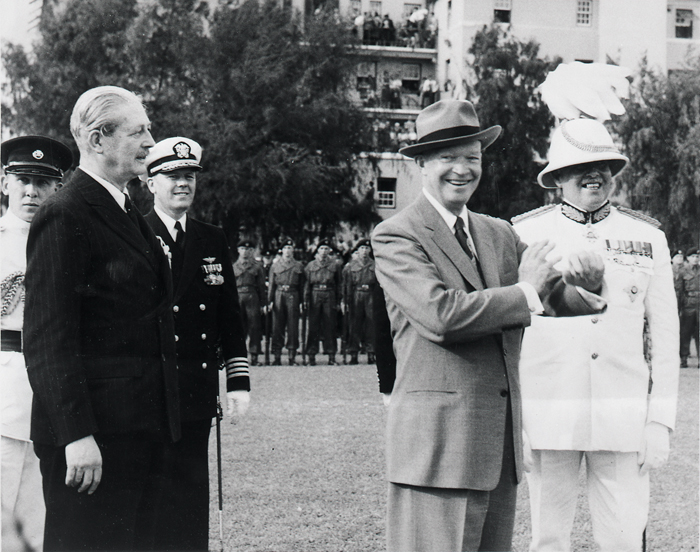
US President Dwight D. Eisenhower and British Prime Minister Harold Macmillan meet for talks in Bermuda in March 1957, partly to repair Anglo-American relations after the disastrous Suez Crisis of the previous year

The British breakthrough came in the wake of the Soviet Union's launch of Sputnik 1, the world's first artificial satellite, on 4 October 1957. Sputnik came as a tremendous shock to the American public, who had trusted that American technological superiority ensured their invulnerability. Suddenly, there was incontrovertible proof that, in missile and space technology at least, the Soviet Union was actually ahead. In the widespread calls for action in response to the Sputnik crisis, officials in the United States and Britain seized the opportunity to mend the relationship between the two nations that had been damaged by the 1956 Suez Crisis. At the suggestion of Harold Caccia, the British Ambassador to the United States, Macmillan wrote to Eisenhower on 10 October urging that the two countries pool their resources to meet the challenge. To do this, the McMahon Act's restrictions on nuclear cooperation needed to be relaxed.

British information security, or the lack thereof, no longer seemed so important now that the Soviet Union was apparently ahead and the United Kingdom had independently developed the hydrogen bomb. The trenchant opposition from the United States Congress's Joint Committee on Atomic Energy that had derailed previous attempts was absent. Amendments to the Atomic Energy Act of 1954 passed Congress on 30 June 1958, and were signed into law by Eisenhower on 2 July 1958. The 1958 US–UK Mutual Defence Agreement was signed on 3 July, and was approved by Congress on 30 July. Macmillan called this "the Great Prize".

The Anglo-American Special Relationship proved mutually beneficial, although it was never one of equals; the United States was far larger than Britain both militarily and economically. Britain soon became dependent on the United States for its nuclear weapons, as it lacked the resources to produce a range of designs. The British decided to adapt the American Mark 28 as a cheaper alternative to doing their own development. This Anglicised version of the Mark 28 became Red Snow. Other weapons were acquired through Project E, under which weapons in American custody were supplied for the use of the RAF and British Army.

Nuclear material was also acquired from the United States. Under the Mutual Defence Agreement 5.4 tonnes of UK produced plutonium was sent to the US in return for 6.7 kilograms (15 lb) of tritium and 7.5 tonnes of highly enriched uranium between 1960 and 1979. This replaced production from the British uranium enrichment facility at Capenhurst in Cheshire, although much of the highly enriched uranium was not used for weapons, but as fuel for the growing UK fleet of nuclear submarines. The Royal Navy ultimately acquired entire weapons systems, with the UK Polaris programme and Trident nuclear programme using American missiles with British nuclear warheads.

=== Operation Dominic ===
In addition to the British tests during Operation Grapple, the United States used Christmas Island for nuclear testing in Operation Dominic in 1962. Twenty-four nuclear bombs were detonated near Christmas Island as part of this test series. In 1979, the Gilbert Islands, Phoenix Islands and Line Islands, which included Christmas Island and Malden Island, became independent of the United Kingdom as the Republic of Kiribati. By the 1980s, there was a permanent population of around 1,200 the majority of whom were Gilbertese. The spelling of the name of the island was changed to Kiritimati, the Gilbertese writing of Christmas. Malden Island was uninhabited, but Penrhyn Island was part of the Cook Islands, a self-governing dependency of New Zealand.

=== Health effects ===
In 2005, a Massey University study that was contracted and paid for by a veterans' organisation in New Zealand examined some 50 sailors who observed the tests from ships. It was found in one battery of tests, that they were indistinguishable from the control group, which is interpreted as indicating that "DNA repair mechanisms in the veterans are not deficient". The same Massey University team tested for chromosome translocations within peripheral blood lymphocytes, and a statistically higher rate of this non-germline abnormality was found.

Various veterans' organisations then filed a class action lawsuit against the UK Ministry of Defence following the publication of the study, with many media outlets reporting on it at the time.

The effects of radioactive fallout from the Grapple tests were researched by a 2010 British Government study that concluded the fallout did not reach concentrations that could affect the surrounding nature. The Ministry of Defence maintained that few people were exposed to any radiation or contamination at all, and that studies had shown little or no health effects. An analysis of illnesses in veterans of Grapple and other weapons tests produced statistics that are hard to interpret.

The veterans showed rates of illness that were slightly higher than the control group, but the control group had lower rates of illness than the population as a whole while the veterans had rates that were about the same. Neither of these results has a clear explanation. Some veterans of Operation Grapple believe that cancers, bone problems and genetic defects passed on to subsequent generations have been consequences of their radiation exposure.

In 1993, Ken McGinley, a veteran of five of the tests, and Edward Egan, a veteran of Grapple Y, sued for £100,000 damages (equivalent to £215,205 in 2025) over multiple health problems which they attributed to their involvement in the tests. They took their claim to the European Court of Human Rights, which rejected it in a 5–4 split decision on 9 June 1998. An appeal to the court to reopen the case was declined in January 2000. A group of 1,011 British ex-servicemen were denied permission to sue the Ministry of Defence by the Supreme Court in March 2012, on the grounds that too much time had elapsed since they became aware of their medical conditions, under the terms of the Limitation Act 1980.

In January 2015, the Prime Minister of Fiji, Frank Bainimarama, announced that the Fijian government would provide Fiji $9,855 compensation payments to the 24 surviving Fijian servicemen who participated in Operation Grapple. On 21 November 2022 British veterans of nuclear tests won a medal after years of campaigning.
