= Osnabrück Canal =

Artificial waterway in central Germany

Coordinates: 52°23′25″N 7°57′22″E

The Osnabrück Canal (German: Stichkanal Osnabrück, formerly the Zweigkanal Osnabrück) or SKO, is an artificial waterway, about 14.5 kilometres (9 mi) long, that links the Mittelland Canal in central Germany with the port in the town of Osnabrück. It was built between 1910 and 1915 and runs largely parallel to the unnavigable River Hase, the greatest distance between the two being about 1 kilometre (0.6 mi).

The 11th Armoured Division crossed the canal during World War II as it advanced across Germany.

== Course ==
The branch canal begins in Bramsche-Pente near the 30.39 kilometre point of the Mittelland Canal with a surface elevation of 50.3 m above NN and runs initially southwards. After about 2.5 km it crosses the boundary with the municipality of Wallenhorst where there is a yacht harbour. After 7.2 km the canal reaches the Hollager locks, where the surface elevation is raised to 55.05 m above NN.

The canal now continues in a southeasterly direction into the borough of Osnabrück, where shortly thereafter a side branch, which may only be entered with permission, heads south passing the boathouses of the Osnabrück water sports clubs.

Next the canal enter the port area of Osnabrück in the quarter of Hafen: first the port of Piesberger Hafen, which used to dispatch products from the nearby quarry in the Piesberg, next the oil harbour (Ölhafen) which supplies the city with mineral oils.

At the next locks, Schleuse Haste, at km 12.7, the water level is raised to 59.8 m above NN, before the federal waterway ends at 13 km. It is categorized as a class IV waterway and is the responsibility of the Minden Water and Shipping Office. Here the city port (Stadthafen) begins in which various goods are stored and transshipped. With a length of about 1.5 km the harbour basin is the terminus of the branch canal.

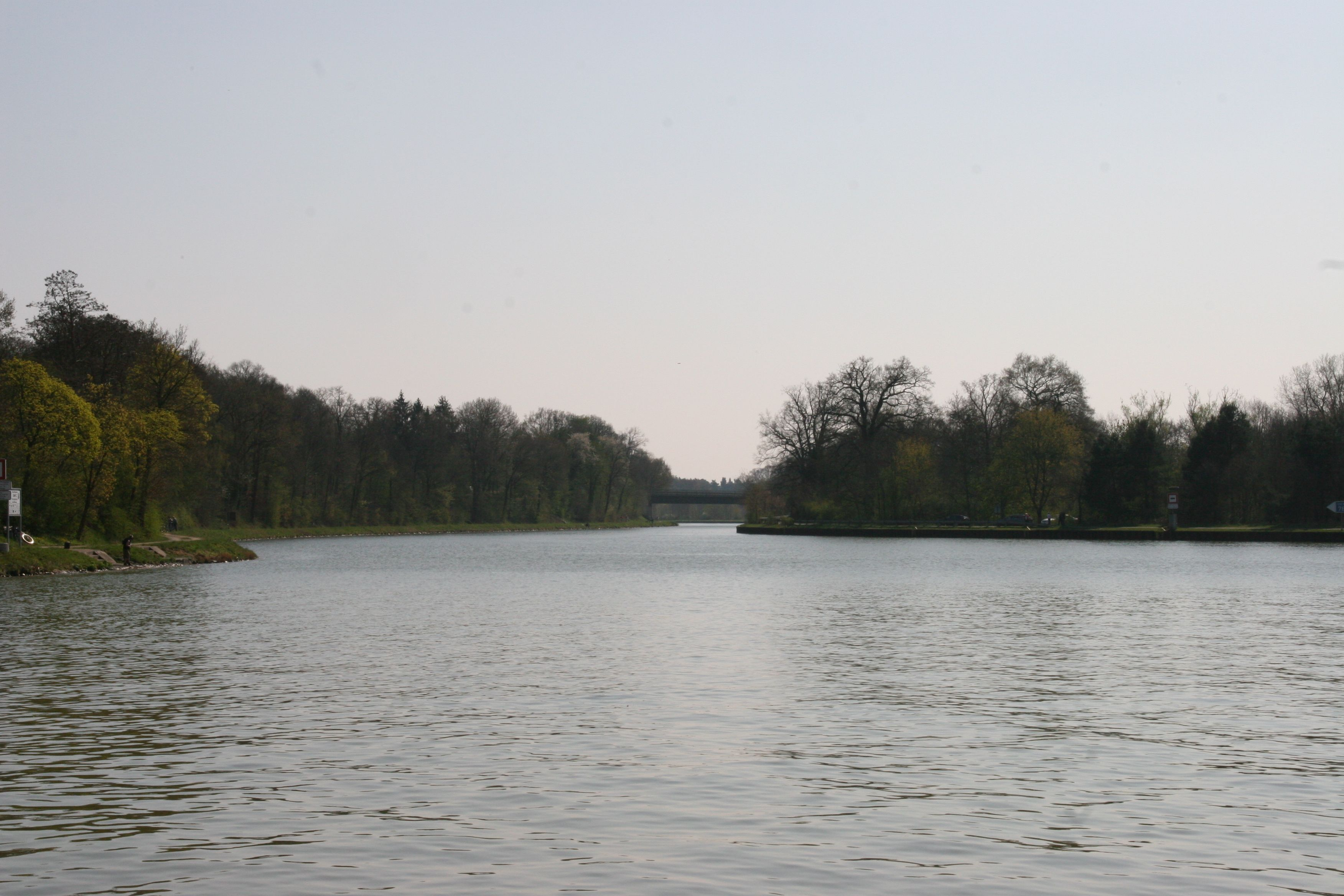
Osnabrück Canal where it branches off the Mittelland Canal near Achmer

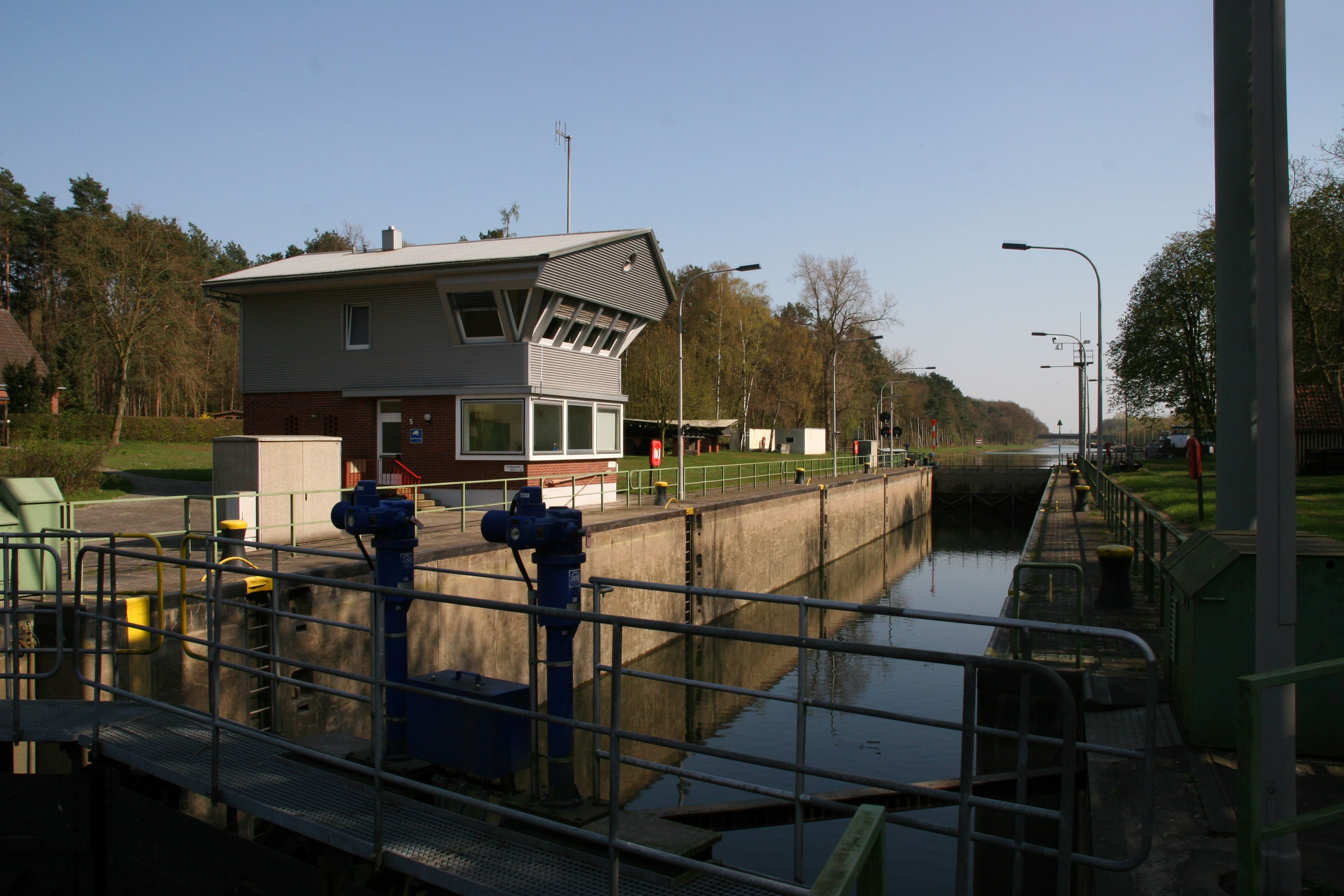
Osnabrück Canal, Hollager Schleuse lock

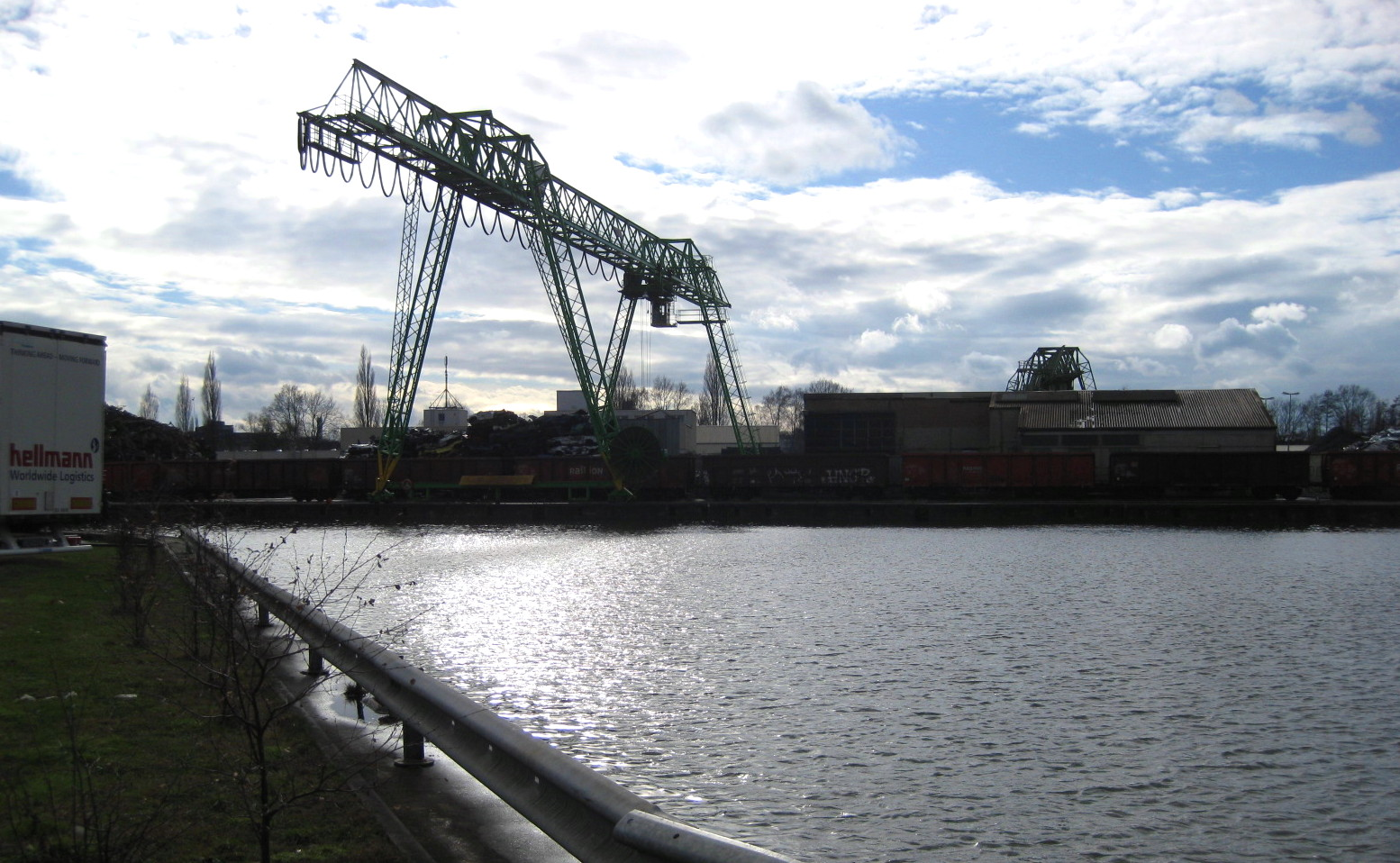
The canal ends in Osnabrück's city harbour.
