= Childress Municipal Airport =

Public use airport in the United States

Childress Municipal Airport (former Childress Army Airfield)
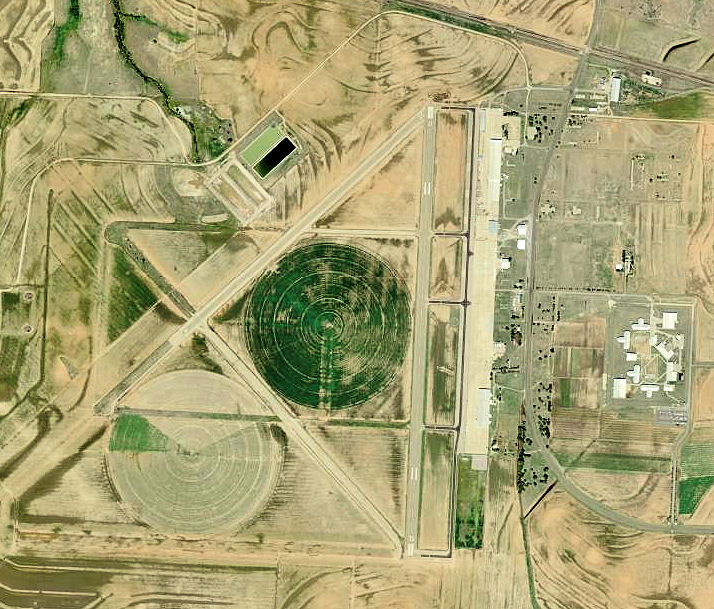
- USGS 2006 orthophoto
- IATA: CDS; ICAO: KCDS; FAA LID: CDS

Summary
- Airport type: Public
- Owner: City of Childress
- Serves: Childress, Texas
- Elevation AMSL: 1,954 ft (596 m)
- Coordinates: 34°26′02″N 100°17′17″W

Map
- Location of airport in Texas

Runways
Direction	Length		Surface
Direction	ft	m	Surface
18/36	5,949	1,813	Asphalt
4/22	4,425	1,349	Asphalt

Statistics (2009)
- Aircraft operations: 3,040
- Based aircraft: 15
- Source: Federal Aviation Administration

Childress Municipal Airport (IATA: CDS, ICAO: KCDS, FAA LID: CDS) is a public use airport located four nautical miles (5 mi, 7 km) west of the central business district of Childress, a city in Childress County, Texas, United States. The airport is owned by the City of Childress.

== History ==
The airport was opened in October 1942 as Childress Army Airfield and was used by the United States Army Air Forces as a training base.

Childress AAF operated as a bombardier-training school under the Central Flying Training Command. It occupied an area of 2,474 acres (10.01 km^{2}). Construction of the field was announced on 2 May 1942, and began immediately thereafter. After the field was closed on December 21, 1945, it was donated to the city and transformed into a municipal airport.

== Facilities and aircraft ==
Childress Municipal Airport covers an area of 2,500 acres (1,012 ha) at an elevation of 1,954 feet (596 m) above mean sea level. It has two asphalt paved runways: 18/36 is 5,949 by 75 feet (1,813 x 23 m) and 4/22 is 4,425 by 60 feet (1,349 x 18 m).

For the 12-month period ending July 27, 2009, the airport had 3,040 aircraft operations, an average of 253 per month: 99% general aviation and 1% military. At that time there were 15 aircraft based at this airport: 80% single-engine, 7% helicopter, and 13% ultralight.

== See also ==
- List of airports in Texas
