= Sundial (weapon) =

Codename for 1950s proposed American nuclear weapon

Sundial was the codename of one of two massive nuclear weapons proposed for testing by the University of California Radiation Laboratory, Livermore Branch as part of a classified American weapons project in the early 1950s. Announced in 1954 by Hungarian–American physicist Edward Teller at a meeting of the Man Advisory Committee of the Atomic Energy Commission (AEC), it was intended to have a yield of 10 gigatons of TNT. If built and detonated, Sundial would have created a fireball up to 50 kilometers (30 miles) in diameter, instantly igniting everything within 400 kilometers (250 miles) and causing a magnitude 9 earthquake. It was thought that the explosion would lead to an apocalyptic nuclear winter.

The Sundial bomb was never built or tested. Teller's proposal for the bomb shocked other attendees at the AEC meeting, and fellow physicist Isidor Rabi dismissed it as an "advertising stunt".

== Background ==
After the United States developed and deployed its first atomic bombs, the Soviet Union detonated its first bomb in 1949, leading to a nuclear arms race during which the number of nuclear weapons escalated from nine in 1946 to 20,000 by 1960.

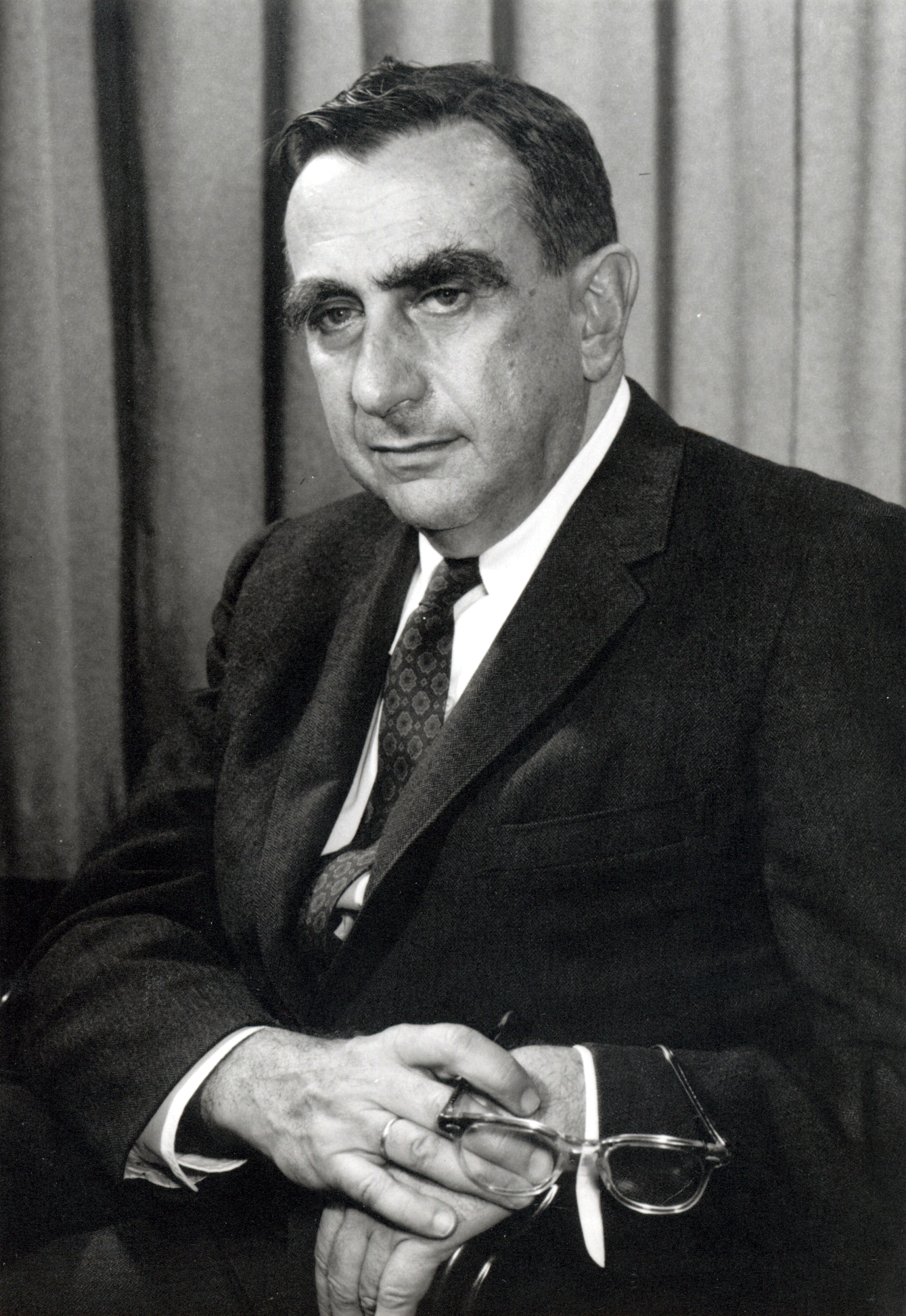
Edward Teller in 1958

The first nuclear weapons to be developed relied solely on nuclear fission of plutonium or enriched uranium as their source of nuclear energy. Later came the development of thermonuclear weapons, commonly called hydrogen bombs, which use a pure fission or boosted fission primary stage to ignite nuclear fusion in a secondary stage, using the hydrogen isotopes deuterium and tritium as fuel. Thermonuclear weapons can be made to be far more powerful than those that rely solely on fission. The Castle Bravo test in 1954 had a yield of 15 megatons; a thousand times more powerful than Little Boy, the bomb dropped on Hiroshima.

Edward Teller had advocated for the development of a thermonuclear "super" bomb since the early days of the Manhattan Project, but there was little push to develop such weapons until after the Soviet Union tested its first atomic bomb in 1949. President Harry Truman directed the Atomic Energy Commission to work in developing thermonuclear weapons in 1950. The first tests to utilize nuclear fusion came during Operation Greenhouse in 1951, which included the first trial of a boosted fission weapon in the Item test. The first test of a true thermonuclear device, codenamed Ivy Mike, took place on November 1, 1952. The explosion had a yield of 10.4 megatons and destroyed the small island of Elugelab where it was tested. This first device, however, was too heavy to work as a deliverable weapon. The first deployable thermonuclear weapon designs were tested during Operation Castle in 1954.

== Proposal and development ==
At a meeting with the Atomic Energy Commission in 1954, following Operation Castle, Teller proposed the 10-gigaton Sundial device and the 1-gigaton Gnomon device. Others at the meeting were shocked by the proposal, and Isidor Isaac Rabi dismissed the idea as an "advertising stunt" rather than a serious proposal for a weapon. If detonated at an altitude of 28 miles (45 km) the Sundial device could ignite fires across an area the size of the country of France. While neither device was ever built or tested, the Lawrence Livermore National Laboratory made plans to test a prototype Gnomon weapon during Operation Redwing in 1956.

== See also ==
- Doomsday device
- Tsar Bomba
