= Nuclear weapons testing =

Controlled detonation of nuclear weapons for scientific or political purposes

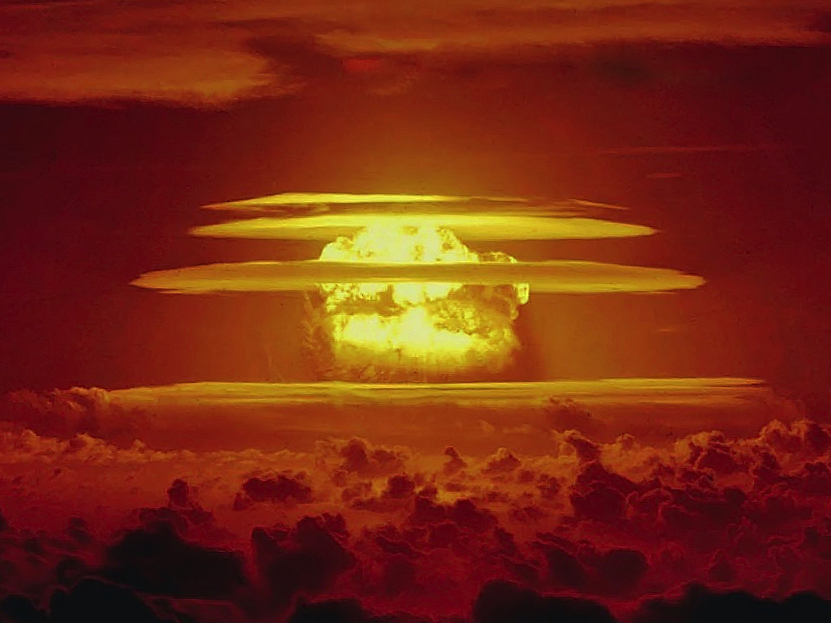
The mushroom cloud from the Castle Bravo thermonuclear weapon test in 1954, the largest nuclear weapons test ever conducted by the United States

Nuclear weapons tests are experiments carried out to determine the performance of nuclear weapons and the effects of their explosion. Over 2,000 nuclear weapons tests have been carried out since 1945. Nuclear testing is a sensitive political issue. Governments have often performed tests to signal strength. Because of their destruction and fallout, testing has seen opposition by civilians as well as governments, with international bans having been agreed on. Thousands of tests have been performed, with most in the second half of the 20th century.

The first nuclear device was detonated as a test by the United States at the Trinity site in New Mexico on July 16, 1945, with a yield approximately equivalent to 20 kilotons of TNT. The first thermonuclear weapon technology test of an engineered device, codenamed Ivy Mike, was tested at the Enewetak Atoll in the Marshall Islands on November 1, 1952 (local date), also by the United States. The largest nuclear weapon ever tested was the Tsar Bomba of the Soviet Union at Novaya Zemlya on October 30, 1961, with the largest yield ever seen, an estimated 50–58 megatons.

With the advent of nuclear technology and its increasingly global fallout an anti-nuclear movement formed and in 1963, three (UK, US, Soviet Union) of the then four nuclear states and many non-nuclear states signed the Limited Test Ban Treaty, pledging to refrain from testing nuclear weapons in the atmosphere, underwater, or in outer space. The treaty permitted underground nuclear testing. France continued atmospheric testing until 1974, and China continued until 1980. Neither has signed the treaty.

Underground tests conducted by the Soviet Union continued until 1990, the United Kingdom until 1991, the United States until 1992, and both China and France until 1996. In signing the Comprehensive Nuclear-Test-Ban Treaty in 1996, these countries pledged to discontinue all nuclear testing; the treaty has not yet entered into force because of its failure to be ratified by eight countries. Non-signatories India and Pakistan last tested nuclear weapons in 1998. North Korea conducted nuclear tests in 2006, 2009, 2013, January 2016, September 2016 and 2017. The most recent confirmed nuclear test occurred in September 2017 in North Korea.

== Types ==
Four major types of nuclear testing: 1. atmospheric, 2. underground, 3. exoatmospheric, and 4. underwater

Nuclear weapons tests have historically been divided into four categories reflecting the medium or location of the test.

- Atmospheric testing involves explosions that take place in the atmosphere. Generally, these have occurred as devices detonated on towers, balloons, barges, or islands, or dropped from airplanes, and some only buried far enough to intentionally create a surface-breaking crater. The United States, the Soviet Union, and China have all conducted tests involving explosions of missile-launched warheads (See List of nuclear weapons tests#Tests of live warheads on rockets). Nuclear explosions close enough to the ground to draw dirt and debris into their mushroom cloud can generate large amounts of nuclear fallout due to irradiation of the debris (particularly with neutron radiation) as well as radioactive contamination of otherwise non-radioactive material. This definition of atmospheric is used in the Limited Test Ban Treaty, which banned this class of testing along with exoatmospheric and underwater.
- Underground testing is conducted below the surface of the earth at varying depths. Underground nuclear testing comprised the majority of nuclear tests by the United States and the Soviet Union during the Cold War; other forms of nuclear testing were banned by the Limited Test Ban Treaty in 1963. True underground tests are intended to be fully contained and emit a negligible amount of fallout. These nuclear tests do occasionally "vent" to the surface, producing from nearly none to considerable amounts of radioactive debris as a consequence. Underground testing, almost by definition, causes seismic activity of a magnitude that depends on the yield of the nuclear device and the composition of the medium in which it is detonated, and generally creates a subsidence crater. In 1976, the United States and the USSR agreed to limit the maximum yield of underground tests to 150 kt with the Threshold Test Ban Treaty.
  Underground testing also falls into two physical categories: tunnel tests in generally horizontal tunnel drifts, and shaft tests in vertically drilled holes.
- Exoatmospheric testing is conducted above the atmosphere. The test devices are lifted on rockets. These high-altitude nuclear explosions can generate a nuclear electromagnetic pulse (NEMP) when they occur in the ionosphere, and charged particles resulting from the blast can cross hemispheres following geomagnetic lines of force to create an auroral display.
- Underwater testing involves nuclear devices being detonated underwater, usually moored to a ship or a barge (which is subsequently destroyed by the explosion). Tests of this nature have usually been conducted to evaluate the effects of nuclear weapons against naval vessels (such as in Operation Crossroads), or to evaluate potential sea-based nuclear weapons (such as nuclear torpedoes or depth charges). Underwater tests close to the surface can disperse large amounts of radioactive particles in water and steam, contaminating nearby ships or structures, though they generally do not create fallout other than very locally to the explosion.

=== Salvo tests ===
Another way to classify nuclear tests is by the number of explosions that constitute the test. The treaty definition of a salvo test is:

In conformity with treaties between the United States and the Soviet Union, a salvo is defined, for multiple explosions for peaceful purposes, as two or more separate explosions where a period of time between successive individual explosions does not exceed 5 seconds and where the burial points of all explosive devices can be connected by segments of straight lines, each of them connecting two burial points, and the total length does not exceed 40 kilometers. For nuclear weapon tests, a salvo is defined as two or more underground nuclear explosions conducted at a test site within an area delineated by a circle having a diameter of two kilometers and conducted within a total period of time of 0.1 seconds.

The USSR has exploded up to eight devices in a single salvo test; Pakistan's second and last official test exploded four different devices. Almost all lists in the literature are lists of tests; in the lists in Wikipedia (for example, Operation Cresset has separate items for Cremino and Caerphilly, which together constitute a single test), the lists are of explosions.

== Purpose ==
Separately from these designations, nuclear tests are also often categorized by the purpose of the test itself.

- Weapons-related tests are designed to garner information about how (and if) the weapons themselves work. Some serve to develop and validate a specific weapon type. Others test experimental concepts or are physics experiments meant to gain fundamental knowledge of the processes and materials involved in nuclear detonations.
- Weapons effects tests are designed to gain information about the effects of the weapons on structures, equipment, organisms, and the environment. They are mainly used to assess and improve survivability to nuclear explosions in civilian and military contexts, tailor weapons to their targets, and develop the tactics of nuclear warfare.
- Safety experiments are designed to study the behavior of weapons in simulated accident scenarios. In particular, they are used to verify that a (significant) nuclear detonation cannot happen by accident. They include one-point safety tests and simulations of storage and transportation accidents.
- Nuclear test detection experiments are designed to improve the capabilities to detect, locate, and identify nuclear detonations, in particular, to monitor compliance with test-ban treaties. In the United States these tests are associated with Operation Vela Uniform before the Comprehensive Test Ban Treaty stopped all nuclear testing among signatories.
- Peaceful nuclear explosions were conducted to investigate non-military applications of nuclear explosives. In the United States, these were performed under the umbrella name of Operation Plowshare.

Aside from these technical considerations, tests have been conducted for political and training purposes, and can often serve multiple purposes.

== Alternatives to full-scale testing ==
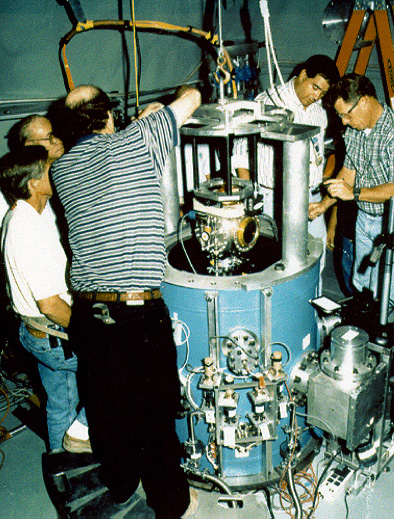
Subcritical experiment at the Nevada National Security Site

Since the 1996 Comprehensive Nuclear-Test-Ban Treaty, "nuclear explosions" of all kinds are banned. Nuclear nations have invested in many alternatives to maintain confidence in weapon capability:

- Computer simulation is used extensively to provide as much information as possible without physical testing. Mathematical models for such simulation model scenarios not only of performance but also of shelf life and maintenance. A theme has generally been that even though simulations cannot fully replace physical testing, they can reduce the amount that is necessary.
- Physical testing
  - Materials testing
    - Subcritical (or cold) tests involving fissile materials and high explosives that purposely result in no yield. The name refers to the lack of creation of a critical mass of fissile material. Subcritical tests continue to be performed by the United States, Russia, and the People's Republic of China, at least.
    - Proxy isotope testing: high temperature/density/pressure compression testing of non-fissile isotopes such as plutonium-242 or uranium-238, to determine a bomb core's relevant equation of state.
  - Fission testing
    - Critical mass experiments studying fissile material compositions, densities, geometries, and reflectors. They can be subcritical or supercritical, in which case significant radiation fluxes can be produced. This type of test has resulted in several criticality accidents.
    - Hydronuclear tests (hydrodynamical + nuclear) study nuclear materials under the conditions of explosive shock compression. They can create subcritical conditions, or supercritical conditions with yields ranging from negligible all the way up to a substantial fraction of full weapon yield. Any fission yield is considered banned by the CTBT.
  - Fusion testing: inertial confinement fusion experiments using lasers, like the National Ignition Facility, or magnetized liners, like the Z Pulsed Power Facility, or projectile compression. These study the plasma physics and ignition of deuterium-tritium mixtures.

Subcritical tests executed by the United States include:

Subcritical Tests
Name	Date Time (UT (Note: Universal Time at the Nevada National Security Site is 8 hours after local time; UT dates are one day after local date for UT times after 16:00.))	Location	Elevation + Height	Notes
A series of 50 tests	January 1, 1960	Los Alamos National Lab Test Area 49 35.82289°N 106.30216°W	2,183 metres (7,162 ft) and 20 metres (66 ft)	Series of 50 tests during US/USSR joint nuclear test ban.
Odyssey		NTS Area U1a 37.01139°N 116.05983°W	1,222 metres (4,009 ft) and 190 metres (620 ft)	
Trumpet		NTS Area U1a-102D 37.01099°N 116.05848°W	1,222 metres (4,009 ft) and 190 metres (620 ft)	
Kismet	March 1, 1995	NTS Area U1a 37.01139°N 116.05983°W	1,222 metres (4,009 ft) and 293 metres (961 ft)	Kismet was a proof of concept for modern hydronuclear tests; it did not contain any SNM (Special Nuclear Material—plutonium or uranium).
Rebound	July 2, 1997 10:—:—	NTS Area U1a 37.01139°N 116.05983°W	1,222 metres (4,009 ft) and 293 metres (961 ft)	Provided information on the behavior of new plutonium alloys compressed by high-pressure shock waves; same as Stagecoach but for the age of the alloys.
Holog	September 18, 1997	NTS Area U1a.101A 37.01036°N 116.05888°W	1,222 metres (4,009 ft) and 290 metres (950 ft)	Holog and Clarinet may have switched locations.
Stagecoach	March 25, 1998	NTS Area U1a 37.01139°N 116.05983°W	1,222 metres (4,009 ft) and 290 metres (950 ft)	Provided information on the behavior of aged (up to 40 years) plutonium alloys compressed by high-pressure shock waves.
Bagpipe	September 26, 1998	NTS Area U1a.101B 37.01021°N 116.05886°W	1,222 metres (4,009 ft) and 290 metres (950 ft)	
Cimarron	December 11, 1998	NTS Area U1a 37.01139°N 116.05983°W	1,222 metres (4,009 ft) and 290 metres (950 ft)	Plutonium surface ejecta studies.
Clarinet	February 9, 1999	NTS Area U1a.101C 37.01003°N 116.05898°W	1,222 metres (4,009 ft) and 290 metres (950 ft)	Holog and Clarinet may have switched places on the map.
Oboe	September 30, 1999	NTS Area U1a.102C 37.01095°N 116.05877°W	1,222 metres (4,009 ft) and 290 metres (950 ft)	
Oboe 2	November 9, 1999	NTS Area U1a.102C 37.01095°N 116.05877°W	1,222 metres (4,009 ft) and 290 metres (950 ft)	
Oboe 3	February 3, 2000	NTS Area U1a.102C 37.01095°N 116.05877°W	1,222 metres (4,009 ft) and 290 metres (950 ft)	
Thoroughbred	March 22, 2000	NTS Area U1a 37.01139°N 116.05983°W	1,222 metres (4,009 ft) and 290 metres (950 ft)	Plutonium surface ejecta studies, followup to Cimarron.
Oboe 4	April 6, 2000	NTS Area U1a.102C 37.01095°N 116.05877°W	1,222 metres (4,009 ft) and 290 metres (950 ft)	
Oboe 5	August 18, 2000	NTS Area U1a.102C 37.01095°N 116.05877°W	1,222 metres (4,009 ft) and 290 metres (950 ft)	
Oboe 6	December 14, 2000	NTS Area U1a.102C 37.01095°N 116.05877°W	1,222 metres (4,009 ft) and 290 metres (950 ft)	
Oboe 8	September 26, 2001	NTS Area U1a.102C 37.01095°N 116.05877°W	1,222 metres (4,009 ft) and 290 metres (950 ft)	
Oboe 7	December 13, 2001	NTS Area U1a.102C 37.01095°N 116.05877°W	1,222 metres (4,009 ft) and 290 metres (950 ft)	
Oboe 9	June 7, 2002 21:46:—	NTS Area U1a.102C 37.01095°N 116.05877°W	1,222 metres (4,009 ft) and 290 metres (950 ft)	
Mario	August 29, 2002 19:00:—	NTS Area U1a 37.01139°N 116.05983°W	1,222 metres (4,009 ft) and 290 metres (950 ft)	Plutonium surface studies (optical analysis of spall). Used wrought plutonium from Rocky Flats.
Rocco	September 26, 2002 19:00:—	NTS Area U1a 37.01139°N 116.05983°W	1,222 metres (4,009 ft) and 290 metres (950 ft)	Plutonium surface studies (optical analysis of spall), followup to Mario. Used cast plutonium from Los Alamos.
Piano	September 19, 2003 20:44:—	NTS Area U1a.102C 37.01095°N 116.05877°W	1,222 metres (4,009 ft) and 290 metres (950 ft)	
Armando	May 25, 2004	NTS Area U1a 37.01139°N 116.05983°W	1,222 metres (4,009 ft) and 290 metres (950 ft)	Plutonium spall measurements using x-ray analysis. (Note: A video of the Armando test on YouTube)
Step Wedge	April 1, 2005	NTS Area U1a 37.01139°N 116.05983°W	1,222 metres (4,009 ft) and 190 metres (620 ft)	April–May 2005, a series of mini-hydronuclear experiments interpreting Armando results.
Unicorn	August 31, 2006 01:00:—	NTS Area U6c 36.98663°N 116.0439°W	1,222 metres (4,009 ft) and 190 metres (620 ft)	"...confirm nuclear performance of the W88 warhead with a newly-manufactured pit." Early pit studies.
Thermos	January 1, 2007	NTS Area U1a 37.01139°N 116.05983°W	1,222 metres (4,009 ft) and 190 metres (620 ft)	February 6 – May 3, 2007, 12 mini-hydronuclear experiments in thermos-sized flasks.
Bacchus	September 16, 2010	NTS Area U1a.05? 37.01139°N 116.05983°W	1,222 metres (4,009 ft) and 190 metres (620 ft)	
Barolo A	December 1, 2010	NTS Area U1a.05? 37.01139°N 116.05983°W	1,222 metres (4,009 ft) and 190 metres (620 ft)	
Barolo B	February 2, 2011	NTS Area U1a.05? 37.01139°N 116.05983°W	1,222 metres (4,009 ft) and 190 metres (620 ft)	
Castor	September 1, 2012	NTS Area U1a 37.01139°N 116.05983°W	1,222 metres (4,009 ft) and 190 metres (620 ft)	Not even a subcritical, contained no plutonium; a dress rehearsal for Pollux.
Pollux	December 5, 2012	NTS Area U1a 37.01139°N 116.05983°W	1,222 metres (4,009 ft) and 190 metres (620 ft)	A subcritical test with a scaled-down warhead mockup. (Note: A video of the Pollux test on YouTube)
Leda	June 15, 2014	NTS Area U1a 37.01139°N 116.05983°W	1,222 metres (4,009 ft) and 190 metres (620 ft)	Like Castor, the plutonium was replaced by a surrogate; this is a dress rehearsal for the later Lydia. The target was a weapons pit mock-up. (Note: A video of the Leda test on YouTube)
Lydia	??-??-2015	NTS Area U1a 37.01139°N 116.05983°W	1,222 metres (4,009 ft) and 190 metres (620 ft)	Expected to be a plutonium subcritical test with a scaled-down warhead mockup.
Vega	December 13, 2017	Nevada test site		Plutonium subcritical test with a scaled down warhead mockup.
Ediza	February 13, 2019	NTS Area U1a 37.01139°N 116.05983°W		Plutonium subcritical test designed to confirm supercomputer simulations for stockpile safety.
Nightshade A	November 2020	Nevada test site		Plutonium subcritical test designed to measure ejecta emission.

== History ==
The Phoenix of Hiroshima (foreground) in Hong Kong Harbor in 1967; it was involved in several famous anti-nuclear protest voyages against nuclear testing in the Pacific.

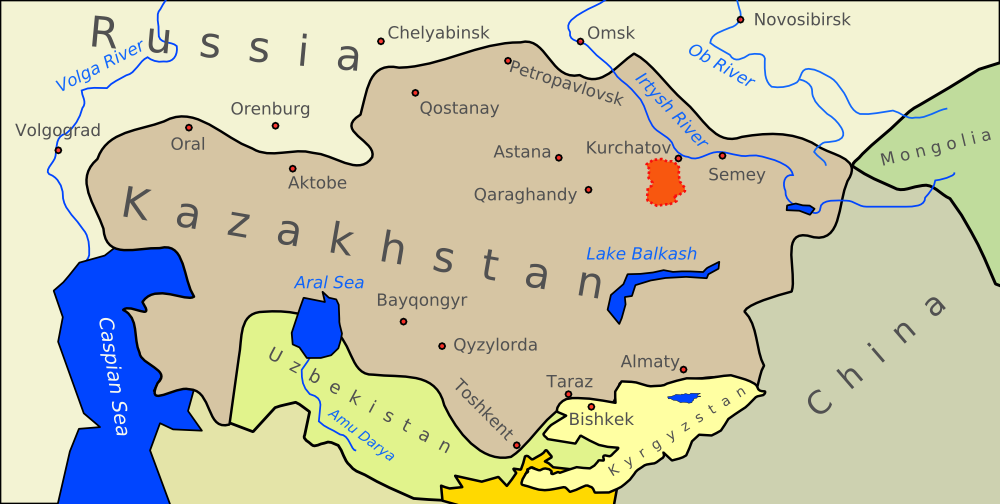
The 6,900-square-mile (18,000 km^{2}) expanse of the Semipalatinsk Test Site (indicated in red), attached to Kurchatov (along the Irtysh river). The site comprised an area the size of Wales.

Notable nuclear explosions
Significance	Country	Name	Date	Yield
First plutonium test	United States	Trinity	July 16, 1945	25 kt
First implosion test	United States	Trinity	July 16, 1945	25 kt
First uranium bomb	United States	Atomic bombing of Hiroshima	August 6, 1945	15 kt
First gun-type bomb	United States	Atomic bombing of Hiroshima	August 6, 1945	15 kt
First underwater test	United States	Crossroads Baker	July 16, 1946	23 kt
First thermonuclear test	United States	Greenhouse George	May 8, 1951	225 kt
First fusion boosting	United States	Greenhouse Item	May 25, 1951	45.5 kt
First underground test	United States	Buster–Jangle Uncle	November 29, 1951	1.2 kt
First multi-megaton test	United States	Ivy Mike	November 1, 1952	10.4 Mt
First cryogenic deuterium test	United States	Ivy Mike	November 1, 1952	10.4 Mt
First layer-cake test	Soviet Union	RDS-6s	August 12, 1953	400 kt
First solid-fuelled thermonuclear test	Soviet Union	RDS-6s	August 12, 1953	400 kt
First exoatmospheric test	United States	Argus I	August 27, 1958	1.7 kt
Largest test	Soviet Union	Tsar Bomba	October 31, 1961	50 Mt
Largest exoatmospheric test	United States	Fishbowl Starfish Prime	July 9, 1962	1.4 Mt
Largest underground test	United States	Grommet Cannikin	November 6, 1971	5 Mt
Most recent atmospheric test	China	1980 Chinese nuclear test	October 16, 1980	1 Mt
Most recent test	North Korea	2017 North Korean nuclear test	September 3, 2017	50-300 kt

The first atomic weapons test was conducted near Alamogordo, New Mexico, on July 16, 1945, during the Manhattan Project, and given the codename "Trinity". The test was originally to confirm that the implosion-type nuclear weapon design was feasible, and to give an idea of what the actual size and effects of a nuclear explosion would be before it was used in combat against Japan. The test gave a good approximation of many of the explosion's effects, but did not give an appreciable understanding of nuclear fallout, which was not well understood by the project scientists until after the atomic bombings of Hiroshima and Nagasaki.

The United States conducted six atomic tests before the Soviet Union developed its first atomic bomb (RDS-1) and tested it on August 29, 1949. Neither country had many atomic weapons to spare at first, and testing was relatively infrequent. (When the US used two weapons for Operation Crossroads in 1946, they were detonating over 20% of their current arsenal.) By the 1950s the United States had established a dedicated test site on its own territory (Nevada Test Site) and was also using a site in the Marshall Islands (Pacific Proving Grounds) for extensive atomic and nuclear testing.

The early tests were used primarily to discern the military effects of atomic weapons (Crossroads had involved the effect of atomic weapons on a navy, and how they functioned underwater) and to test new weapon designs. During the 1950s, these included new hydrogen bomb designs, which were tested in the Pacific, and also new and improved fission weapon designs. The Soviet Union also began testing on a limited scale, primarily in Kazakhstan. During the later phases of the Cold War, both countries developed accelerated testing programs, testing many hundreds of bombs over the last half of the 20th century.

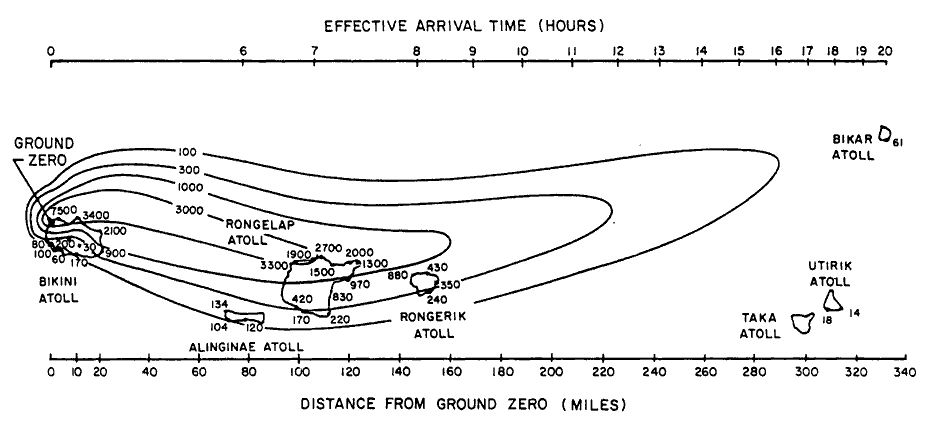
In 1954 the Castle Bravo fallout plume spread dangerous levels of radiation over an area over 100 miles (160 km) long, including inhabited islands.

Atomic and nuclear tests can involve many hazards. Some of these were illustrated in the US Castle Bravo test in 1954. The weapon design tested was a new form of hydrogen bomb, and the scientists underestimated how vigorously some of the weapon materials would react. As a result, the explosion, with a yield of 15 Mt, was over twice what was predicted. The weapon also generated a large amount of radioactive nuclear fallout, more than had been anticipated, and a change in the weather pattern caused the fallout to spread in a direction not cleared in advance. The fallout plume spread high levels of radiation for over 100 miles (160 km), contaminating populated islands in nearby atoll formations. Though they were soon evacuated, many of the islands' inhabitants suffered from radiation burns and later from other effects such as increased cancer rate and birth defects, as did the crew of the Japanese fishing boat Daigo Fukuryū Maru. One crewman died from radiation sickness after returning to port, and it was feared that the radioactive fish they had been carrying may have entered the Japanese food supply.

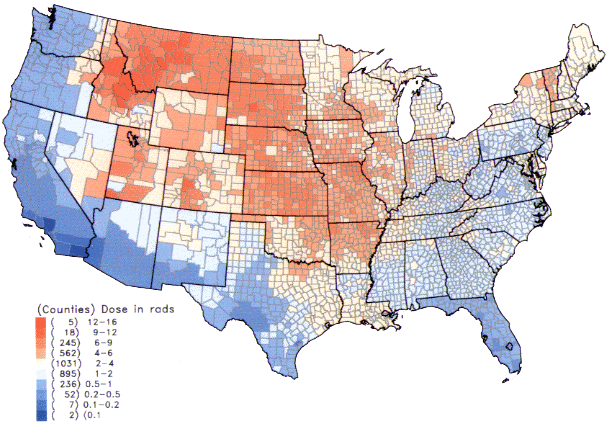
Because of concerns about worldwide fallout levels, the Partial Test Ban Treaty was signed in 1963. Above are the per capita thyroid doses (in rads) in the continental United States resulting from all exposure routes from all atmospheric nuclear tests conducted at the Nevada Test Site from 1951 to 1962.

Castle Bravo was the worst US nuclear accident, but many of its component problems—unpredictably large yields, changing weather patterns, unexpected fallout contamination of populations and the food supply—also occurred during atmospheric nuclear weapons tests by other countries. Concerns over worldwide fallout rates eventually led to the Partial Test Ban Treaty in 1963, which limited signatories to underground testing. Not all countries ceased atmospheric testing, but because the United States and the Soviet Union were responsible for roughly 86% of all nuclear tests, their compliance cut the overall level substantially. France continued atmospheric testing until 1974, and China until 1980.

A tacit moratorium on testing was in effect from 1958 to 1961 and ended with a series of Soviet tests in late 1961, including the Tsar Bomba, the largest nuclear weapon ever tested. The United States responded in 1962 with Operation Dominic, involving dozens of tests including the explosion of a missile launched from a submarine.

Almost all new nuclear powers have announced their possession of nuclear weapons with a nuclear test. The only acknowledged nuclear power that claims never to have conducted a test is South Africa (although see Vela incident), which has since dismantled all of its weapons. Israel is widely thought to possess a sizeable nuclear arsenal though it has never tested, unless they were involved in Vela. Experts disagree on whether states can have reliable nuclear arsenals, especially ones using advanced warhead designs, such as hydrogen bombs and miniaturized weapons, without testing, although all agree that it is unlikely that significant nuclear innovations can be developed without testing. One other approach is to use supercomputers to conduct "virtual" testing, but codes need to be validated against test data.

There have been many attempts to limit the number and size of nuclear tests; the most far-reaching was the Comprehensive Test Ban Treaty of 1996, which, as of 2013, had not been ratified by eight of the "Annex 2 countries" required for it to take effect, including the United States. Nuclear testing became a controversial issue in the United States, with a number of politicians saying that future testing might be necessary to maintain the ageing warheads from the Cold War. Nuclear testing is seen as furthering nuclear arms development, and many are opposed to future testing as an acceleration of the arms race.

In total nuclear test megatonnage, from 1945 to 1992, 520 atmospheric nuclear explosions (including eight underwater) were conducted with a total yield of 545 megatons, with a peak occurring in 1961–1962, when 340 megatons were detonated in the atmosphere by the United States and Soviet Union. The estimated number of underground nuclear tests conducted in the period from 1957 to 1992 was 1,352 explosions with a total yield of 90 Mt.

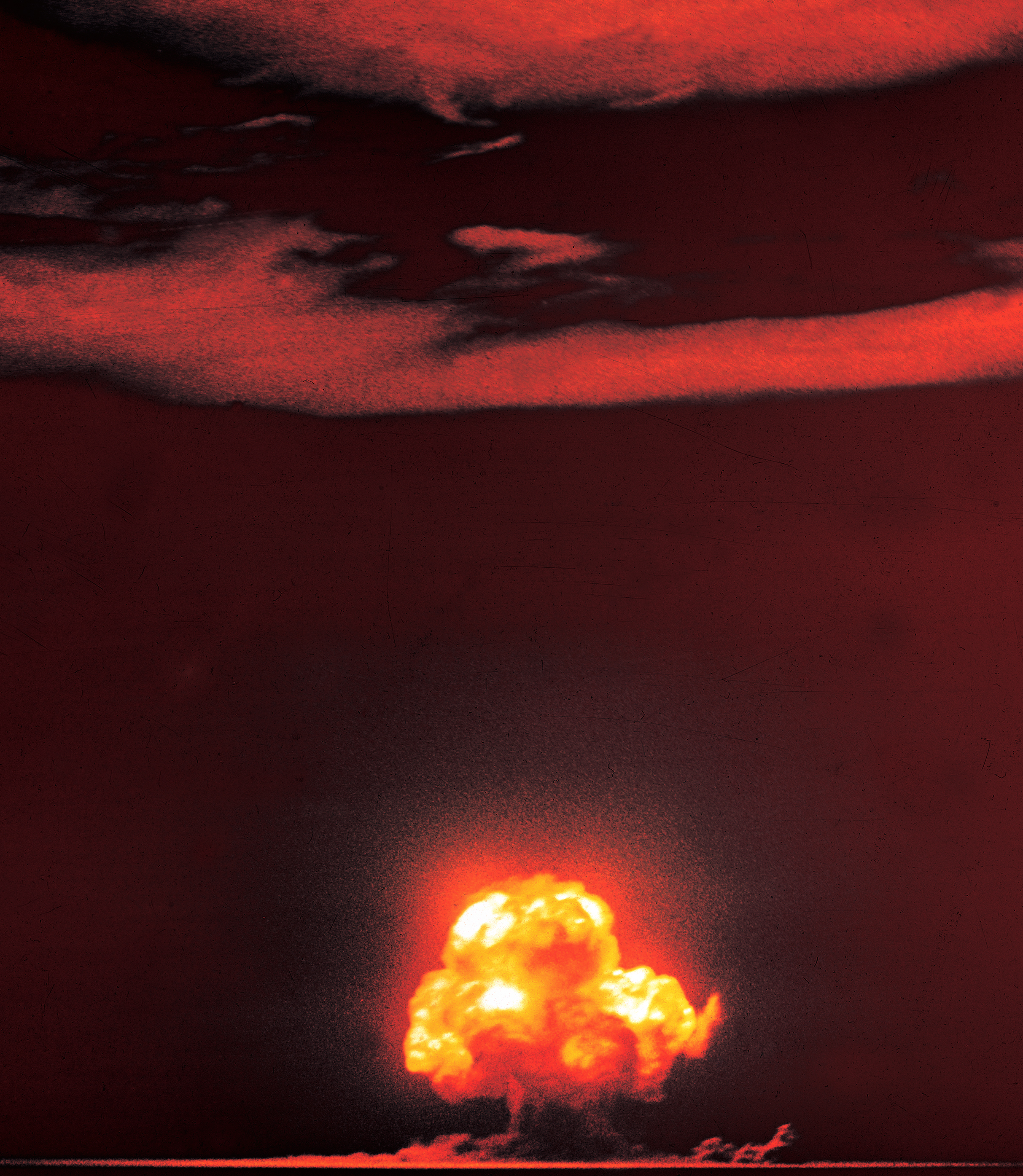
The first atomic test, "Trinity", took place on July 16, 1945.

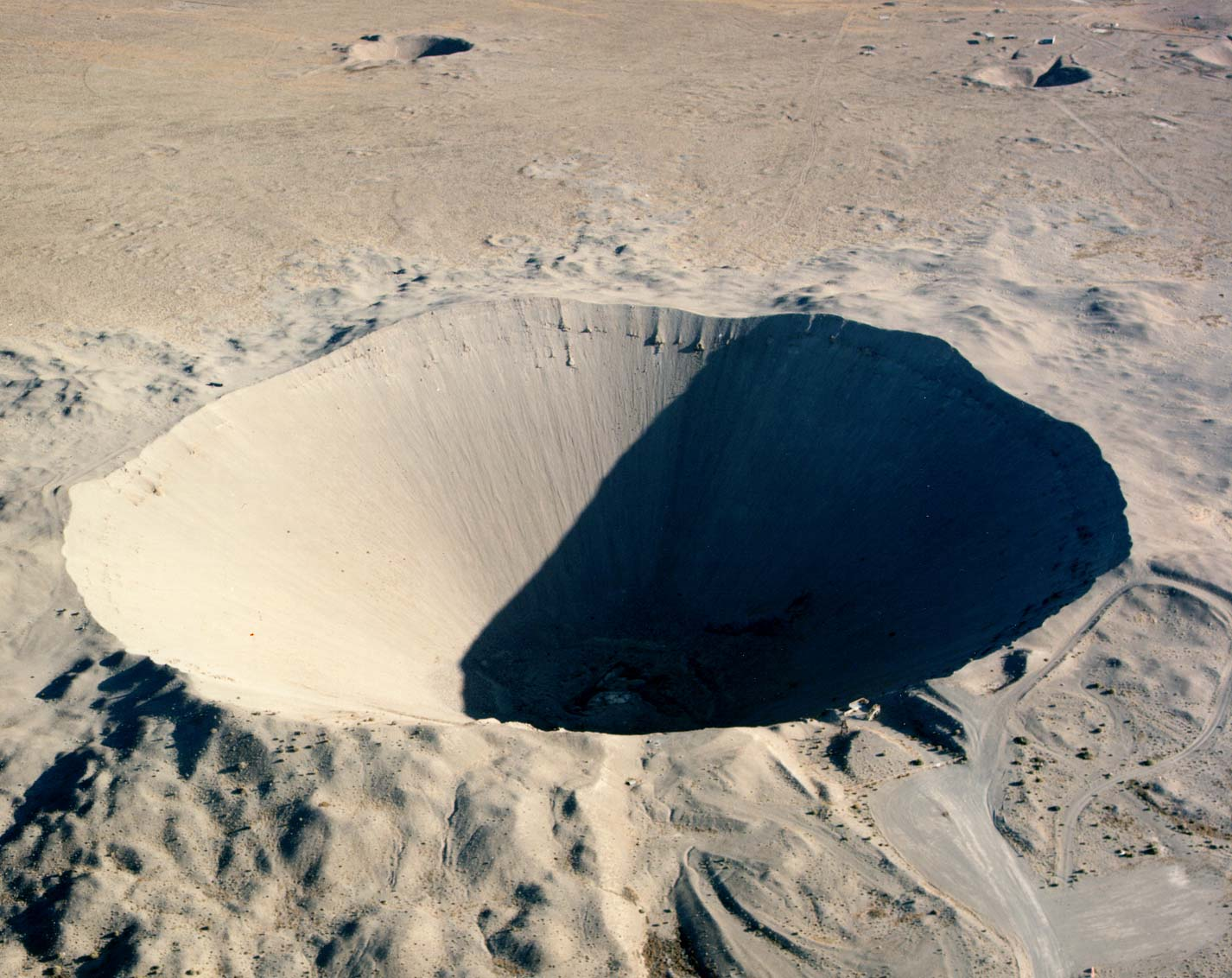
The Sedan test of 1962 was an experiment by the United States in using nuclear devices to excavate large amounts of earth.

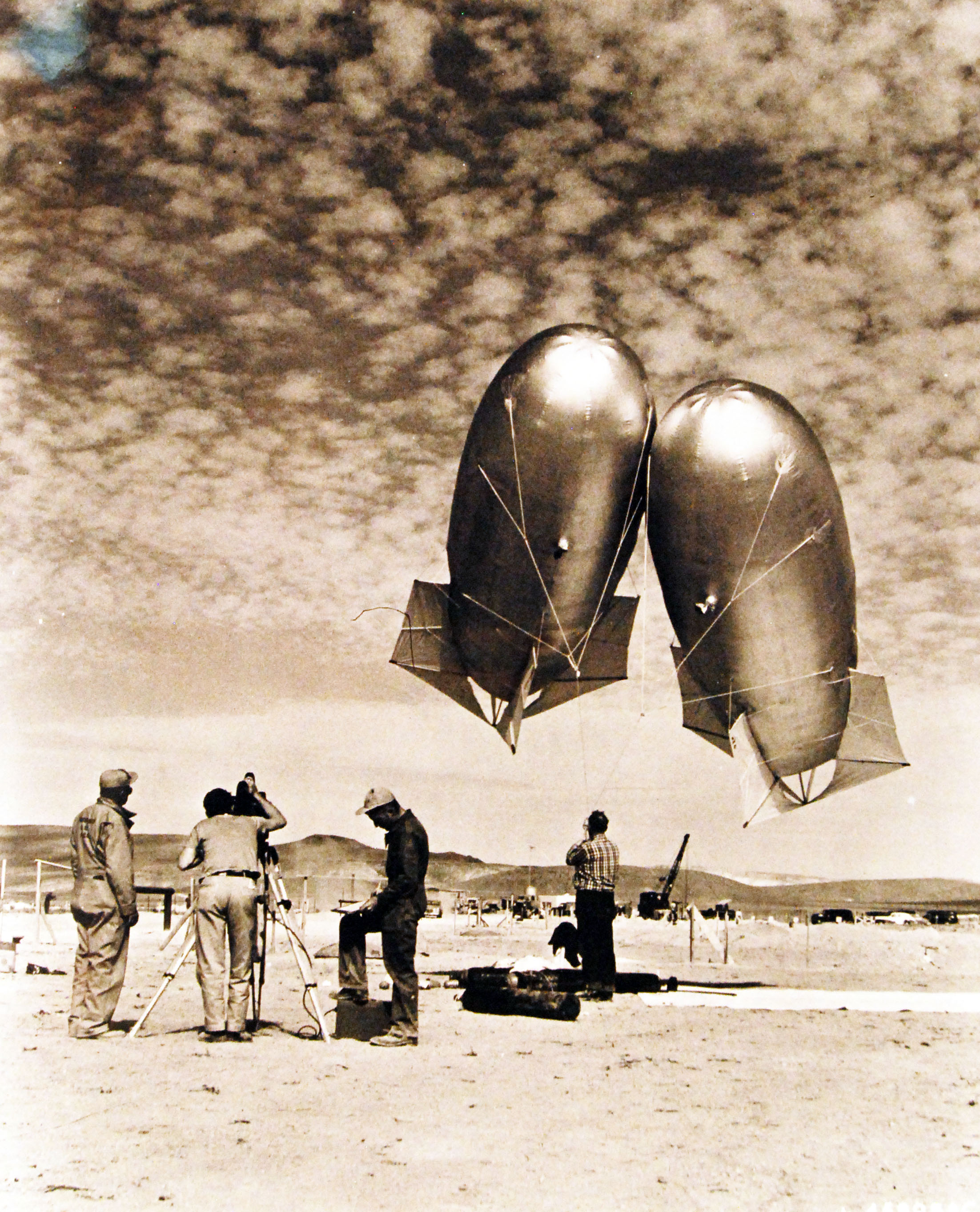
Kytoon balloons were used on Indian Springs Air Force Base, Nevada, April 20, 1952, to get exact weather information during atomic test periods.

== Yield ==
The yield of atomic and thermonuclear weapons is typically measured in kilotons or megatons TNT equivalent. Thermonuclear (fusion/fission by Teller-Ulam design) bombs, often measured in megatons, can be hundreds of times stronger than their atomic (fission only) counterparts measured only in kilotons.

In the US context, it was decided during the Manhattan Project that yield measured in tons of TNT equivalent could be imprecise. This comes from the range of experimental values of the energy content of TNT, ranging from 900 to 1,100 calories per gram (3,800 to 4,600 J/g). There was also the issue of which ton to use, as short tons, long tons, and metric tonnes all had different values. It was decided that one kiloton would be equivalent to 1×10^{12} calories (4.2×10^{12} J) exactly, (the equivalent of 1000 cal/g if the metric tonne were used).

== Nuclear testing by country ==
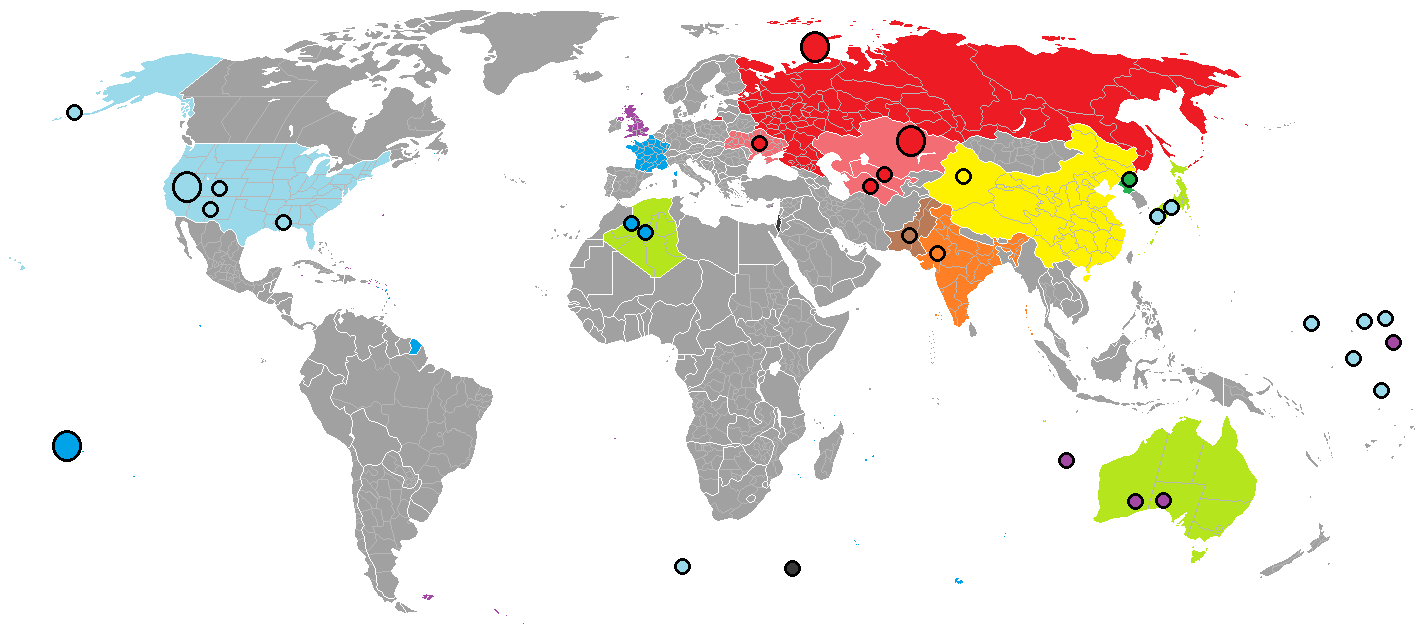
Over 2,000 nuclear tests have been conducted in over a dozen different sites around the world. Red Russia/Soviet Union, blue France, light blue United States, violet Britain, yellow China, orange India, brown Pakistan, green North Korea, and light green (territories exposed to nuclear bombs). The black dot indicates the location of the Vela incident.

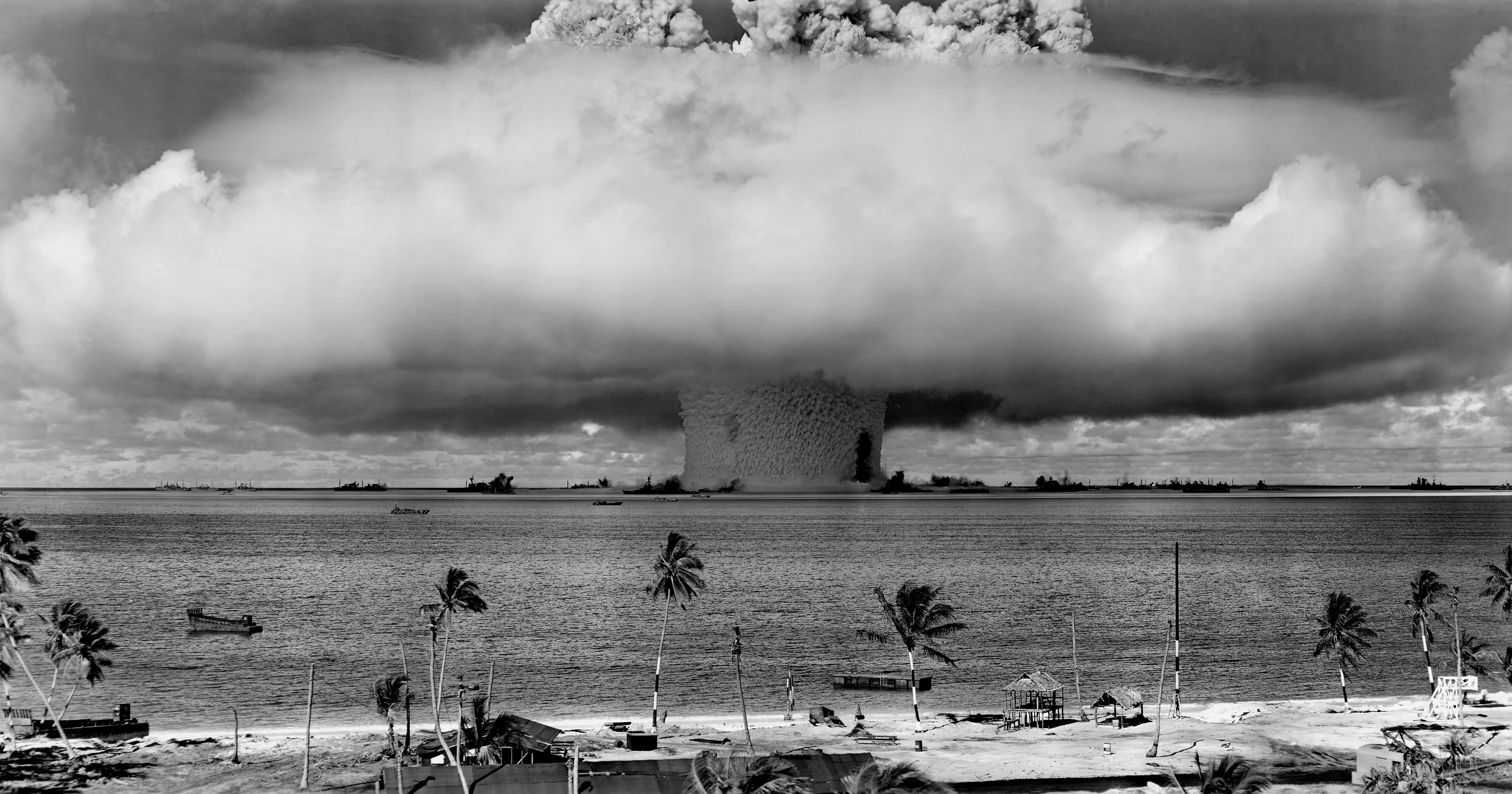
Shot Baker, part of Operation Crossroads, a nuclear test by the United States at Bikini Atoll in 1946

The nuclear powers have conducted more than 2,000 nuclear test explosions (numbers are approximate, as some test results have been disputed):

- United States: 1,054 tests by official count (involving at least 1,149 devices). 219 were atmospheric tests as defined by the CTBT. These tests include 904 at the Nevada Test Site, 106 at the Pacific Proving Grounds and other locations in the Pacific, 3 in the South Atlantic Ocean, and 17 other tests taking place in Amchitka Alaska, Colorado, Mississippi, New Mexico and Nevada outside the NNSS (see Nuclear weapons and the United States for details). 24 tests are classified as British tests held at the NTS. There were 35 Plowshare detonations and 7 Vela Uniform tests; 88 tests were safety experiments and 4 were transportation/storage tests. Motion pictures were made of the explosions, later used to validate computer simulation predictions of explosions. United States' table data.
- Soviet Union: 715 tests (involving 969 devices) by official count, plus 13 unnumbered test failures. Most were at their Southern Test Area at Semipalatinsk Test Site and the Northern Test Area at Novaya Zemlya. Others include rocket tests and peaceful-use explosions at various sites in Russia, Kazakhstan, Turkmenistan, Uzbekistan and Ukraine. Soviet Union's table data.
- United Kingdom: 45 tests, of which 12 were in Australian territory, including three at the Montebello Islands and nine in mainland South Australia at Maralinga and Emu Field, 9 at Christmas Island (Kiritimati) in the Pacific Ocean, plus 24 in the United States at the Nevada Test Site as part of joint test series). 43 safety tests (the Vixen series) are not included in that number, though safety experiments by other countries are. The United Kingdom's summary table.
- France: 210 tests by official count (50 atmospheric, 160 underground), four atomic atmospheric tests at C.S.E.M. near Reggane, 13 atomic underground tests at C.E.M.O. near In Ekker in the French Algerian Sahara, and nuclear atmospheric and underground tests at and around Fangataufa and Moruroa Atolls in French Polynesia. Four of the In Ekker tests are counted as peaceful use, as they were reported as part of the CET's APEX (Application pacifique des expérimentations nucléaires, “Peaceful Application of Nuclear Experiments”), and given alternate names. France's summary table.
- China: 45 tests (23 atmospheric and 22 underground), at Lop Nur Nuclear Weapons Test Base, in Malan, Xinjiang There are two additional unnumbered failed tests. China's summary table.
- India: Six underground explosions (including the first one in 1974), at Pokhran. India's summary table.
- Pakistan: Six underground explosions at Ras Koh Hills and the Chagai District. Pakistan's summary table.
- North Korea: North Korea is the only country in the world that still tests nuclear weapons, and their tests have caused escalating tensions between them and the United States. Their most recent nuclear test was on September 3, 2017. North Korea's summary table.

There may also have been at least three alleged but unacknowledged nuclear explosions (see list of alleged nuclear tests) including the Vela incident.

From the first nuclear test in 1945 until tests by Pakistan in 1998, there was never a period of more than 22 months with no nuclear testing. As of August 2026, the current period is the longest period since 1945 with no acknowledged nuclear tests, lasting for 8 years and 11 months.

A summary table of all the nuclear testing that has happened since 1945 is here: Worldwide nuclear testing counts and summary.

Graph of nuclear testing

== Global fallout ==
Atmospheric ^{14}C Bomb pulse, New Zealand and Austria. The New Zealand curve is representative for the Southern Hemisphere, the Austrian curve is representative for the Northern Hemisphere. Atmospheric nuclear weapon tests almost doubled the concentration of ^{14}C in the Northern Hemisphere.

Nuclear weapons testing did not produce an outcome like nuclear winter as a result of a scenario of a concentrated number of nuclear explosions in a nuclear holocaust, but the thousands of tests, hundreds being atmospheric, did produce a global fallout that peaked in 1963 (the bomb pulse), reaching levels of about 0.15 mSv per year worldwide, or about 7% of average background radiation dose from all sources. It has slowly decreased since, with natural environmental radiation levels being around 1 mSv. This global fallout was one of the main drivers for the ban on nuclear weapons testing, particularly atmospheric testing. It has been estimated that by 2020 between 200,000 to 460,000 people had died as a result of nuclear weapons testing, while the total number of deaths may rise up to 2.4 million people.

== Criticism ==
Nuclear arms tests have been criticized for its arms race and its fallout, with a potentially global fallout.

Nuclear weapons tests have been criticized by anti-nuclear activists as nuclear imperialism, colonialism, ecocide, environmental racism and nuclear genocide.

The movement gained particularly in the 1960s and in the 1980s again.

The international day "End Nuclear Tests Day" raises critical awareness annually.

== Treaties against testing ==
There are many existing anti-nuclear explosion treaties, notably the Partial Nuclear Test Ban Treaty and the Comprehensive Nuclear Test Ban Treaty. These treaties were proposed in response to growing international concerns about environmental damage, among other risks. Nuclear testing involving humans also contributed to the formation of these treaties. Examples can be seen in the following articles:

- Desert Rock exercises
- Totskoye range nuclear tests

The Partial Nuclear Test Ban treaty makes it illegal to detonate a nuclear explosion anywhere except underground, in order to reduce atmospheric fallout. Most countries have signed and ratified the Partial Nuclear Test Ban, which came into effect in October 1963. Of the nuclear states, France, China, and North Korea have never signed the Partial Nuclear Test Ban Treaty.

The 1996 Comprehensive Nuclear-Test-Ban Treaty (CTBT) bans all nuclear explosions everywhere, including underground. For that purpose, the Preparatory Commission of the Comprehensive Nuclear-Test-Ban Treaty Organization is building an international monitoring system with 337 facilities located over the globe. 85% of these facilities are already operational. As of May 2012, the CTBT has been signed by 183 States, of which 157 have also ratified. For the Treaty to enter into force it needs to be ratified by 44 specific nuclear technology-holder countries. These "Annex 2 States" participated in the negotiations on the CTBT between 1994 and 1996 and possessed nuclear power or research reactors at that time. The ratification of eight Annex 2 states is still missing: China, Egypt, Iran, Israel and the United States have signed but not ratified the Treaty; India, North Korea and Pakistan have not signed it.

The following is a list of the treaties applicable to nuclear testing:

Name	Agreement date	In force date	In effect today?	Notes
Unilateral USSR ban	March 31, 1958	March 31, 1958	no	USSR unilaterally stops testing provided the West does as well.
Bilateral testing ban	August 2, 1958	October 31, 1958	no	USA agrees; ban begins on 31 October 1958, 3 November 1958 for the Soviets, and lasts until abrogated by a USSR test on 1 September 1961.
Antarctic Treaty System	December 1, 1959	June 23, 1961	yes	Bans testing of all kinds in Antarctica.
Partial Nuclear Test Ban Treaty (PTBT)	August 5, 1963	October 10, 1963	yes	Ban on all but underground testing.
Outer Space Treaty	January 27, 1967	October 10, 1967	yes	Bans testing on the moon and other celestial bodies.
Treaty of Tlatelolco	February 14, 1967	April 22, 1968	yes	Bans testing in South America and the Caribbean Sea Islands.
Nuclear Non-proliferation Treaty	January 1, 1968	March 5, 1970	yes	Bans the proliferation of nuclear technology to non-nuclear nations.
Seabed Arms Control Treaty	February 11, 1971	May 18, 1972	yes	Bans emplacement of nuclear weapons on the ocean floor outside territorial waters.
Strategic Arms Limitation Treaty (SALT I)	January 1, 1972		no	A five-year ban on installing launchers.
Anti-Ballistic Missile Treaty	May 26, 1972	August 3, 1972	no	Restricts ABM development; additional protocol added in 1974; abrogated by the US in 2002.
Agreement on the Prevention of Nuclear War	June 22, 1973	June 22, 1973	yes	Promises to make all efforts to promote security and peace.
Threshold Test Ban Treaty	July 1, 1974	December 11, 1990	yes	Prohibits higher than 150 kt for underground testing.
Peaceful Nuclear Explosions Treaty (PNET)	January 1, 1976	December 11, 1990	yes	Prohibits higher than 150 kt, or 1500kt in aggregate, testing for peaceful purposes.
Moon Treaty	January 1, 1979	January 1, 1984	no	Bans use and emplacement of nuclear weapons on the moon and other celestial bodies.
Strategic Arms Limitations Treaty (SALT II)	June 18, 1979		no	Limits strategic arms. Kept but not ratified by the US, abrogated in 1986.
Treaty of Rarotonga	August 6, 1985		?	Bans nuclear weapons in South Pacific Ocean and islands. US never ratified.
Intermediate Range Nuclear Forces Treaty (INF)	December 8, 1987	June 1, 1988	no	Eliminated Intermediate Range Ballistic Missiles (IRBMs). Implemented by 1 June 1991. Both sides alleged the other was in violation of the treaty. Expired following US withdrawal, 2 August 2019.
Treaty on Conventional Armed Forces in Europe	November 19, 1990	July 17, 1992	yes	Bans categories of weapons, including conventional, from Europe. Russia notified signatories of intent to suspend, 14 July 2007.
Strategic Arms Reduction Treaty I (START I)	July 31, 1991	December 5, 1994	no	35-40% reduction in ICBMs with verification. Treaty expired 5 December 2009, renewed (see below).
Treaty on Open Skies	March 24, 1992	January 1, 2002	yes	Allows for unencumbered surveillance over all signatories.
US unilateral testing moratorium	October 2, 1992	October 2, 1992	no	George. H. W. Bush declares unilateral ban on nuclear testing. Extended several times, not yet abrogated.
Strategic Arms Reduction Treaty (START II)	January 3, 1993	January 1, 2002	no	Deep reductions in ICBMs. Abrogated by Russia in 2002 in retaliation of US abrogation of ABM Treaty.
Southeast Asian Nuclear-Weapon-Free Zone Treaty (Treaty of Bangkok)	December 15, 1995	March 28, 1997	yes	Bans nuclear weapons from southeast Asia.
African Nuclear Weapon Free Zone Treaty (Pelindaba Treaty)	January 1, 1996	July 16, 2009	yes	Bans nuclear weapons in Africa.
Comprehensive Nuclear Test Ban Treaty (CTBT)	September 10, 1996		yes (effectively)	Bans all nuclear testing, peaceful and otherwise. Strong detection and verification mechanism (CTBTO). US has signed and adheres to the treaty, though has not ratified it.
Treaty on Strategic Offensive Reductions (SORT, Treaty of Moscow)	May 24, 2002	June 1, 2003	no	Reduces warheads to 1700–2200 in ten years. Expired, replaced by START II.
START I treaty renewal	April 8, 2010	January 26, 2011	yes	Same provisions as START I.

== Compensation for victims ==
Over 500 atmospheric nuclear weapons tests were conducted at various sites around the world from 1945 to 1980. As public awareness and concern mounted over possible health hazards associated with exposure to nuclear fallout, various studies were done to assess the extent of the hazard. A Centers for Disease Control and Prevention/ National Cancer Institute study claimed that nuclear fallout might have led to approximately 11,000 excess deaths, most caused by thyroid cancer linked to exposure to iodine-131.

- United States: Prior to March 2009, the US was the only nation to compensate nuclear test victims. Since the Radiation Exposure Compensation Act of 1990, more than $1.38 billion in compensation has been approved. The money is going to people who took part in the tests, notably at the Nevada Test Site, and to others exposed to the radiation from these tests. As of 2017, the US government has refused to pay for the medical care of troops who associate their health problems with the construction of Runit Dome in the Marshall Islands.
- France: In March 2009, the French Government offered to compensate victims for the first time, and legislation was drafted which would allow payments to people who suffered health problems related to the tests. The payouts would be available to victims' descendants and would include Algerians, who were exposed to nuclear testing in the Sahara in 1960. Victims say the eligibility requirements for compensation are too narrow.
- United Kingdom: There is no formal British government compensation program. Nearly 1,000 veterans of Christmas Island nuclear tests in the 1950s are engaged in legal action against the Ministry of Defense for negligence. They say they suffered health problems and were not warned of potential dangers before the experiments.
- Russia: Decades later, Russia offered compensation to veterans who were part of the 1954 Totsk test. There was no compensation to civilians made sick by the Totsk test. Anti-nuclear groups say there has been no government compensation for other nuclear tests.
- China: China has undertaken highly secretive atomic tests in remote deserts in a Central Asian border province. Anti-nuclear activists say there is no known government program for compensating victims.

== Milestone nuclear explosions ==
The following list is of milestone nuclear explosions. In addition to the atomic bombings of Hiroshima and Nagasaki, the first nuclear test of a given weapon type for a country is included, as well as tests that were otherwise notable (such as the largest test ever). All yields (explosive power) are given in their estimated energy equivalents in kilotons of TNT (see TNT equivalent). Putative tests (like Vela incident) have not been included.

Date	Name	Yield (kt)	Country	Significance
July 16, 1945	Trinity	18–20	United States	First fission-device test, first plutonium implosion detonation.
August 6, 1945	Little Boy	12–18	United States	Bombing of Hiroshima, Japan, first detonation of a uranium gun-type device, first use of a nuclear device in combat.
August 9, 1945	Fat Man	18–23	United States	Bombing of Nagasaki, Japan, second detonation of a plutonium implosion device (the first being the Trinity Test), second and last use of a nuclear device in combat.
August 29, 1949	RDS-1	22	Soviet Union	First fission-weapon test by the Soviet Union.
May 8, 1951	George	225	United States	First boosted nuclear weapon test, first weapon test to employ fusion in any measure.
October 3, 1952	Hurricane	25	United Kingdom	First fission weapon test by the United Kingdom.
November 1, 1952	Ivy Mike	10,400	United States	First "staged" thermonuclear weapon, with cryogenic fusion fuel, primarily a test device and not weaponized.
November 16, 1952	Ivy King	500	United States	Largest pure-fission weapon ever tested.
August 12, 1953	RDS-6s	400	Soviet Union	First fusion-weapon test by the Soviet Union (not "staged").
March 1, 1954	Castle Bravo	15,000	United States	First "staged" thermonuclear weapon using dry fusion fuel. A serious nuclear fallout accident occurred. Largest nuclear detonation conducted by United States.
November 22, 1955	RDS-37	1,600	Soviet Union	First "staged" thermonuclear weapon test by the Soviet Union (deployable).
May 31, 1957	Orange Herald	720	United Kingdom	Largest boosted fission weapon ever tested. Intended as a fallback "in megaton range" in case British thermonuclear development failed.
November 8, 1957	Grapple X	1,800	United Kingdom	First (successful) "staged" thermonuclear weapon test by the United Kingdom.
February 13, 1960	Gerboise Bleue	70	France	First fission weapon test by France.
October 31, 1961	Tsar Bomba	50,000	Soviet Union	Largest thermonuclear weapon ever tested—scaled down from its initial 100 Mt design by 50%.
October 16, 1964	596	22	China	First fission-weapon test by the People's Republic of China.
June 17, 1967	Test No. 6	3,300	China	First "staged" thermonuclear weapon test by the People's Republic of China.
August 24, 1968	Canopus	2,600	France	First "staged" thermonuclear weapon test by France.
May 18, 1974	Smiling Buddha	12	India	First fission nuclear explosive test by India.
May 11, 1998	Pokhran-II	45–50	India	First potential fusion-boosted weapon test by India; first deployable fission weapon test by India.
May 28, 1998	Chagai-I	40	Pakistan	First fission weapon (boosted) test by Pakistan.
October 9, 2006	2006 nuclear test	under 1	North Korea	First fission-weapon test by North Korea (plutonium-based).
September 3, 2017	2017 nuclear test	200–300	North Korea	First "staged" thermonuclear weapon test claimed by North Korea.

Note

- "Staged" refers to whether it was a "true" thermonuclear weapon of the so-called Teller–Ulam configuration or simply a form of a boosted fission weapon. For a more complete list of nuclear test series, see List of nuclear tests. Some exact yield estimates, such as that of the Tsar Bomba and the tests by India and Pakistan in 1998, are somewhat contested among specialists.

== See also ==
- Atmospheric focusing – Type of wave interaction causing shock waves
- Atomic Testing Museum (in Nevada in the US)
- High-altitude nuclear explosion – Nuclear detonations in the upper layers of Earth's atmosphere
- Historical nuclear weapons stockpiles and nuclear tests by country
- History of nuclear weapons
- International Day against Nuclear Tests – Annual observance on August 29
- How to Photograph an Atomic Bomb – 2006 book by Peter Kuran
- List of military nuclear accidents (including nuclear weapons accidents)
- List of nuclear weapons tests of the United States
- List of states with nuclear weapons
- Live fire exercise – Military exercise using live munitions
- National Technical Means – Methods of verification of adherence to international treaties
- Nuclear test sites
- Nuclear ethics – Academic and policy-relevant field on problems in the nuclear weapons and energy complex
- Nuclear weapons design
- Project Gnome – 1961 nuclear test explosion in New Mexico, United States
- Rope trick effect – "Spikes" emanating from suspended nuclear explosions
- Subsidence crater – Hole or depression left on the surface over the site of an underground explosion
- Test Readiness Program
- Trinity and Beyond (documentary about nuclear weapon testing)

== General and cited references ==
- Gusterson, Hugh. Nuclear Rites: A Weapons Laboratory at the End of the Cold War. Berkeley, CA: University of California Press, 1996.
- Hacker, Barton C. Elements of Controversy: The Atomic Energy Commission and Radiation Safety in Nuclear Weapons Testing, 1947–1974. Berkeley, CA: University of California Press, 1994.
- Rice, James. Downwind of the Atomic State: Atmospheric Testing and the Rise of the Risk Society. (New York University Press, 2023). https://nyupress.org/9781479815340/downwind-of-the-atomic-state/
- Schwartz, Stephen I. Atomic Audit: The Costs and Consequences of U.S. Nuclear Weapons. Washington, D.C.: Brookings Institution Press, 1998.
- Weart, Spencer R. Nuclear Fear: A History of Images. Cambridge, MA: Harvard University Press, 1985.
