= Greenhouse Item =

1951 American nuclear test

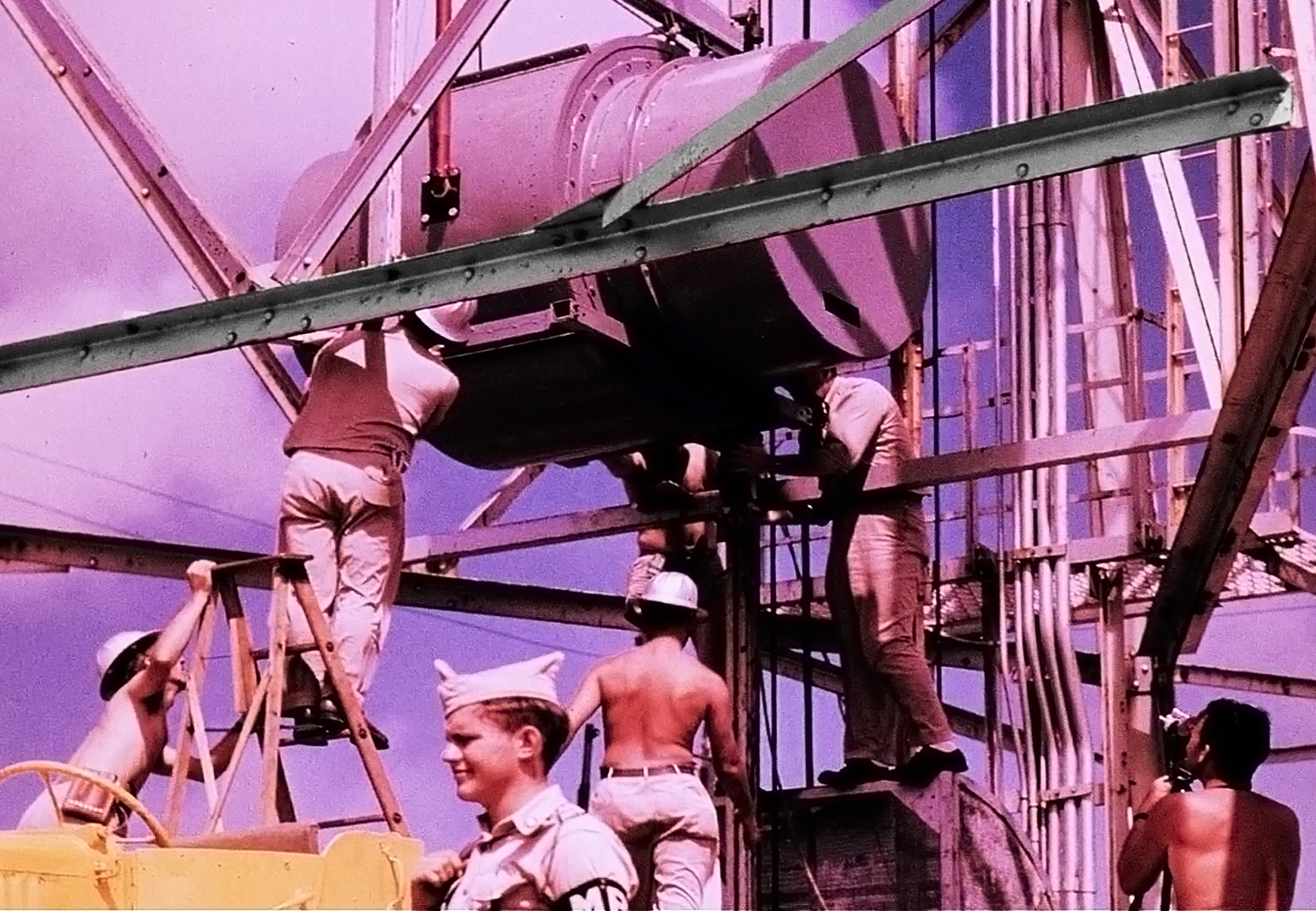
- Greenhouse Item device being raised upward towards its shot-tower

Information
- Country: United States
- Test series: Operation Greenhouse
- Test site: Enewetak
- Date: May 25, 1951
- Test type: Atmospheric
- Yield: 45.5 kt

Test chronology

Greenhouse Item was an American nuclear test conducted on May 25, 1951, as part of Operation Greenhouse at the Pacific Proving Ground, specifically on the island of Engebi in the Enewetak Atoll in the Central Pacific Ocean. This test explosion was the first test of a boosted fission weapon, and the second instance of artificial thermonuclear fusion, following the Greenhouse George test on May 9.

== Description ==
In this test deuterium-tritium (D-T) gas was injected into the enriched uranium core of a nuclear fission bomb. The extreme heat of the fissioning bomb produced thermonuclear fusion reactions within the D-T gas, but not enough of them to be considered a full nuclear fusion bomb. This fusion reaction released a large number of free neutrons, which greatly increased the efficiency of the nuclear fission reaction. The explosive yield of this bomb was 45.5 kilotons, about twice the yield of the unboosted bomb.

The device was code-named "Booster" in its development stages, a name for the mechanism coined by Edward Teller in September 1947. Planning for it had begun in the late 1940s. According to the researcher Chuck Hansen, it was mentioned in official U.S. Atomic Energy Commission documents as early as 1947. The main problems in development were making modifications to the fission core to accept the gas correctly without reducing its own efficiency. The 1951 test was primarily to test the nuclear principles involved, and to gain research data, and it was not considered a design for a weaponizable device. Even as late as 1954, no boosted weapon had entered into the nuclear-weapons stockpile, and the only use for the Greenhouse Item nuclear test had been for its research results.

The "Booster" device was detonated at 6:17 am on May 25, 1951, from a 200-foot-tall (61 m) shot tower on the island of Engebi in the Enewetok Atoll, and its fusion fuel was injected by means of a cryogenic pump at the base of the tower.

== Gallery ==
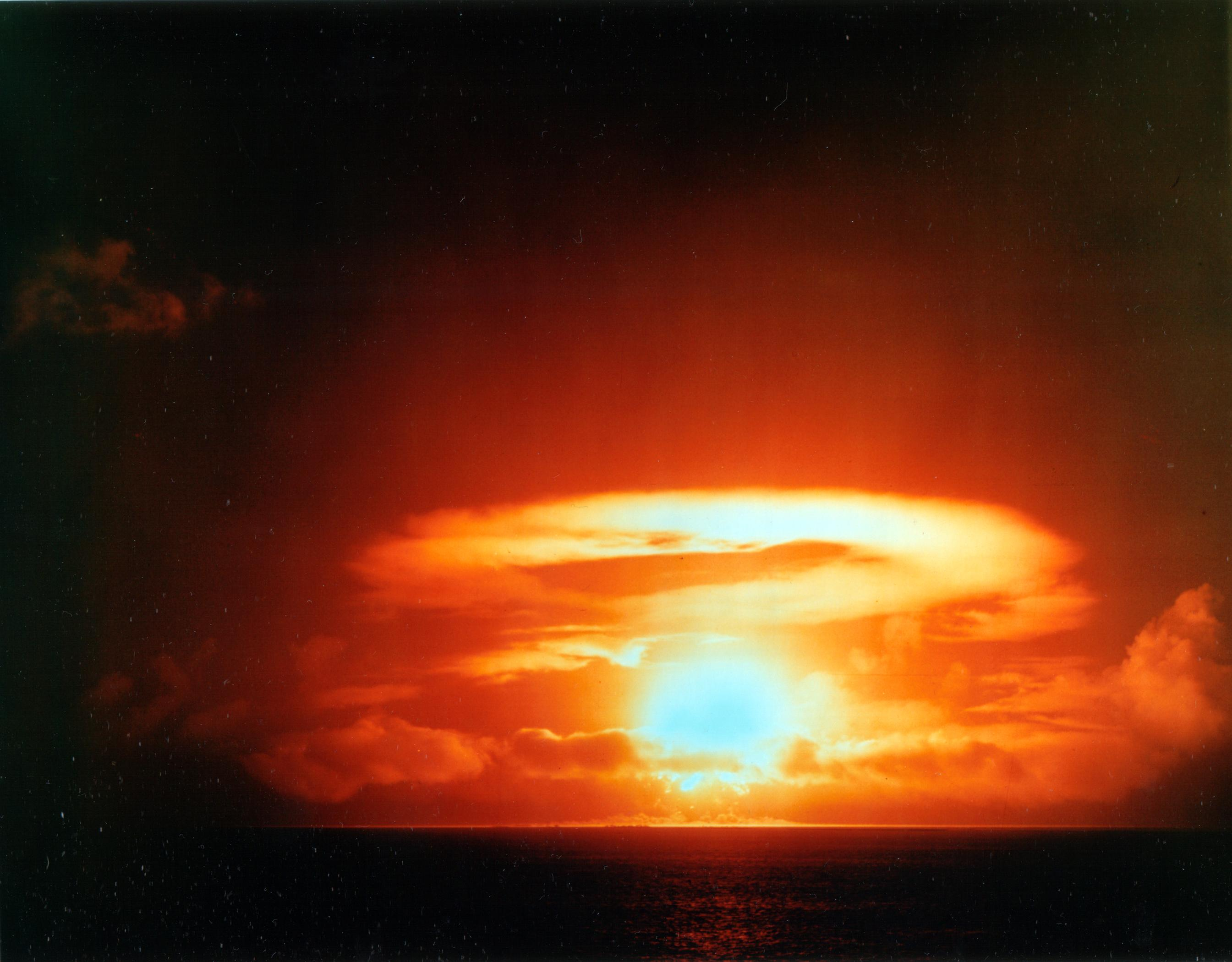
Item fireball

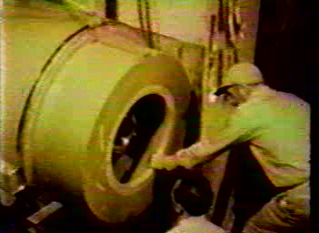
Preparing the "booster" for the test

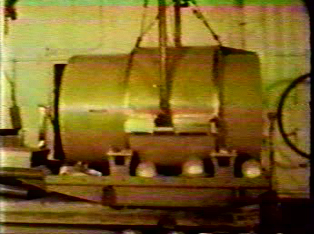
The Item casing
