= Trinity and Beyond =

Trinity and Beyond: The Atomic Bomb Movie
- Cover of the 2009 Blu-ray release, seated VIPs on shot Greenhouse Dog with Crossroads Baker in the background.
- Directed by: Peter Kuran
- Written by: Scott Narrie; Don Pugsley
- Produced by: Peter Kuran
- Narrated by: William Shatner
- Music by: William T. Stromberg
- Production companies: Visual Concept Entertainment; Documentary Film Works
- Release date: September 29, 1995
- Running time: 93 minutes
- Country: United States
- Language: English

Trinity and Beyond: The Atomic Bomb Movie is a 1995 American documentary film directed by Peter Kuran and narrated by William Shatner.

Using restored archive footage, the film traces the development of nuclear weapons and their testing, from America's Trinity test of 1945 (hence the title) to the first Chinese atomic bomb test in 1964. Kuran's commentary on the DVD version claims that the DVD replaces some of the original footage with better-quality versions. There are some short special effects sequences too. The film has also since been released on Blu-ray.

== Synopsis ==
Included is footage of nuclear tests starting with the May 1945 trial run to Trinity (the first atomic bomb), a 100-ton TNT blast used to scale and calibrate the Trinity device, and ending with the last U.S. atmospheric nuclear detonation (called Tightrope) of the Nike Hercules air defense missile in 1963. Also included are test series in the South Pacific, footage of the firing of the U.S. Army's atomic cannon at the Nevada Test Site in 1953, and color images of multi-megaton high altitude air bursts over Johnston Island just before the limited test ban treaty went into effect (banning all except underground detonations) in 1963.

== Production ==
The film's publicity claims that much of the American footage is newly declassified and previously unseen. Kuran's research brought him into contact with many of the cameramen who photographed the American tests, leading to the production of another documentary, Atomic Filmmakers which featured their reminiscences of working on the program. A new patented image restoration process was used for the first time to improve considerably the image quality of old and fading film stock.

The film's music (composed by William T. Stromberg) was performed by the Moscow Symphony Orchestra, symbolizing the end of the Cold War.

Footage from a Soviet documentary about the Tsar Bomba is featured in Trinity and Beyond, where it is referred to as the Russian monster bomb.

== See also ==
- The Atomic Cafe
- How to Photograph an Atomic Bomb
- List of films about nuclear issues
