= How to Photograph an Atomic Bomb =

2006 book by Peter Kuran

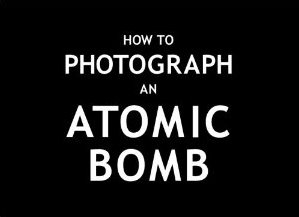
- First edition cover
- Author: Peter Kuran
- Language: English
- Subject: photography
- Publisher: VCE
- Publication date: 2006
- Publication place: United States
- Media type: Print (Hardcover)
- Pages: 142 pp
- ISBN: 1889054194
- OCLC: 171268548

How to Photograph an Atomic Bomb is a history and photography book written by Peter Kuran and published in 2006 by VCE.

== Description ==
It documents the stories of the men who photographed US nuclear weapons tests between 1945–1963 and the techniques they used to capture nuclear blasts on film. The book contains 250 photos and 12 technical diagrams, some of which were previously classified. Research on the book began while Kuran was working as an animator for Star Wars. He was able to interview and collect material from photographers who witnessed the blasts, whom he calls unrecognized patriots.

A traveling exhibit based on the book was purchased by the Atomic Testing Museum and put on display in 2007. In 2010, The New York Times featured a 23-image slideshow on its website with photos taken from the book accompanied by an audio recording of George Yoshitake, then one of the few surviving cameramen.

== See also ==
- List of nuclear weapons tests of the United States
- Trinity and Beyond: The Atomic Bomb Movie
