= Greenhouse George =

1951 American nuclear test

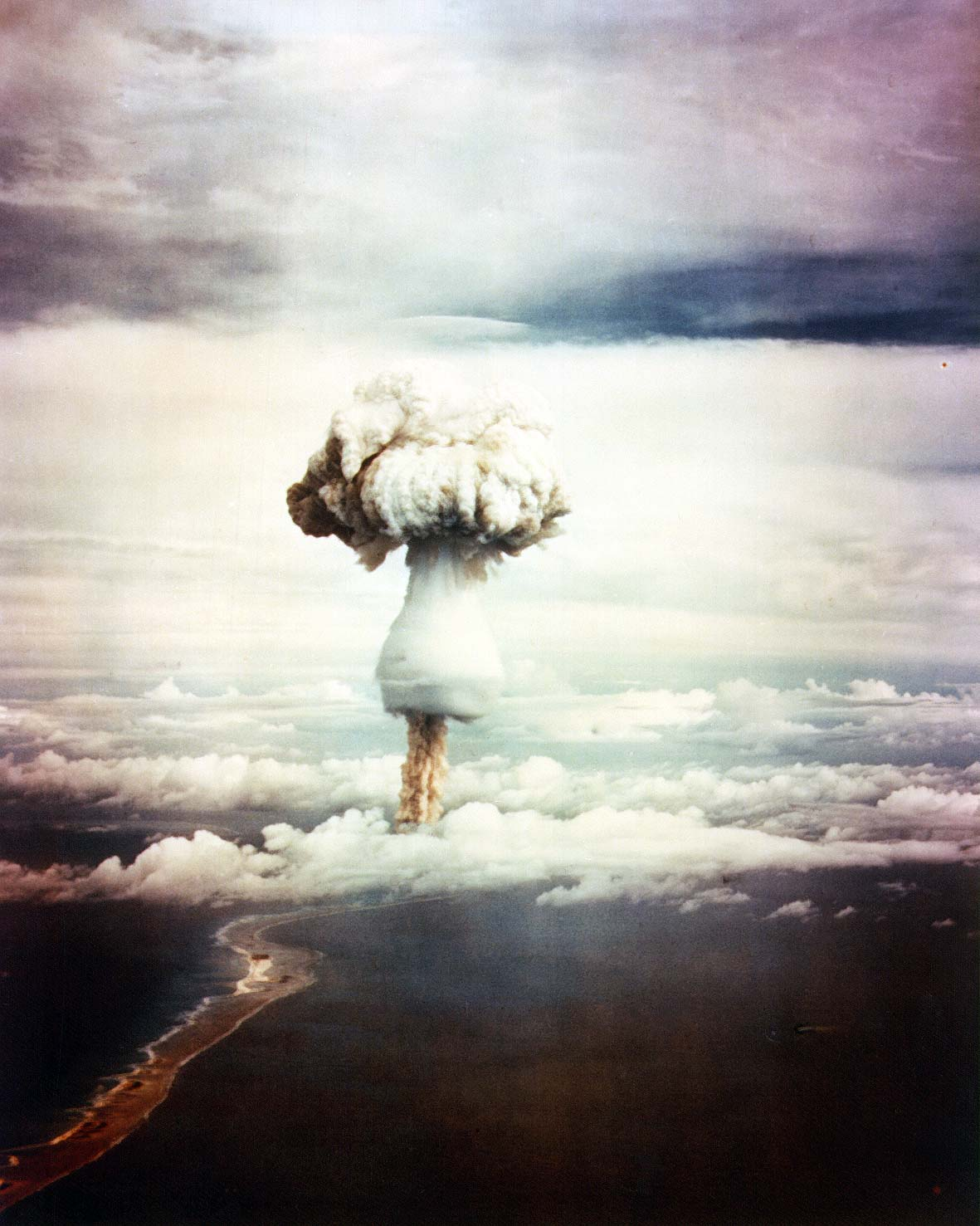
- The George mushroom cloud

Information
- Country: United States
- Test series: Operation Greenhouse
- Test site: Enewetak
- Date: May 8, 1951
- Test type: Atmospheric
- Yield: 225 kt

Test chronology

Greenhouse George was an American nuclear test conducted on May 8, 1951 at Enewetak Atoll, part of Operation Greenhouse. It was the first instance of thermonuclear fusion brought about by humans, i.e. energy release from atomic nuclei colliding at very high temperatures. The largest nuclear explosion until that point, it yielded 225 kilotons TNT equivalent.

The nuclear device, named Cylinder, was a test of the X-ray radiation implosion principle that was key to the Teller-Ulam design, devised in January 1951, the basis for thermonuclear weapons. A large cylindrical implosion annulus of highly enriched uranium channeled X-rays to a beryllium oxide capsule containing less than an ounce of deuterium and tritium. This DT fusion was estimated to yield 25 kilotons of the total yield, and was verified hours later by the detection of characteristic fusion neutrons.

The George test validated the principles which would be used for the world's first full-scale thermonuclear bomb test, Ivy Mike, over a year later, on November 1, 1952.

== Background ==
The first Soviet nuclear test, RDS-1, took place on August 29, 1949. It was detected and announced to the world by United States president Harry Truman on September 23, 1949. The American nuclear establishment, aware of the theoretical possibility of thermonuclear weapons since the early days of the Manhattan Project, vigorously debated whether they should be pursued. On January 31, 1950, Truman issued a statement regarding the United States' program to develop the hydrogen bomb.

On March 9, 1951, American nuclear physicists Edward Teller and Stanisław Ulam wrote a report outlining their Teller-Ulam design, the basis for thermonuclear weapons.

== Design ==
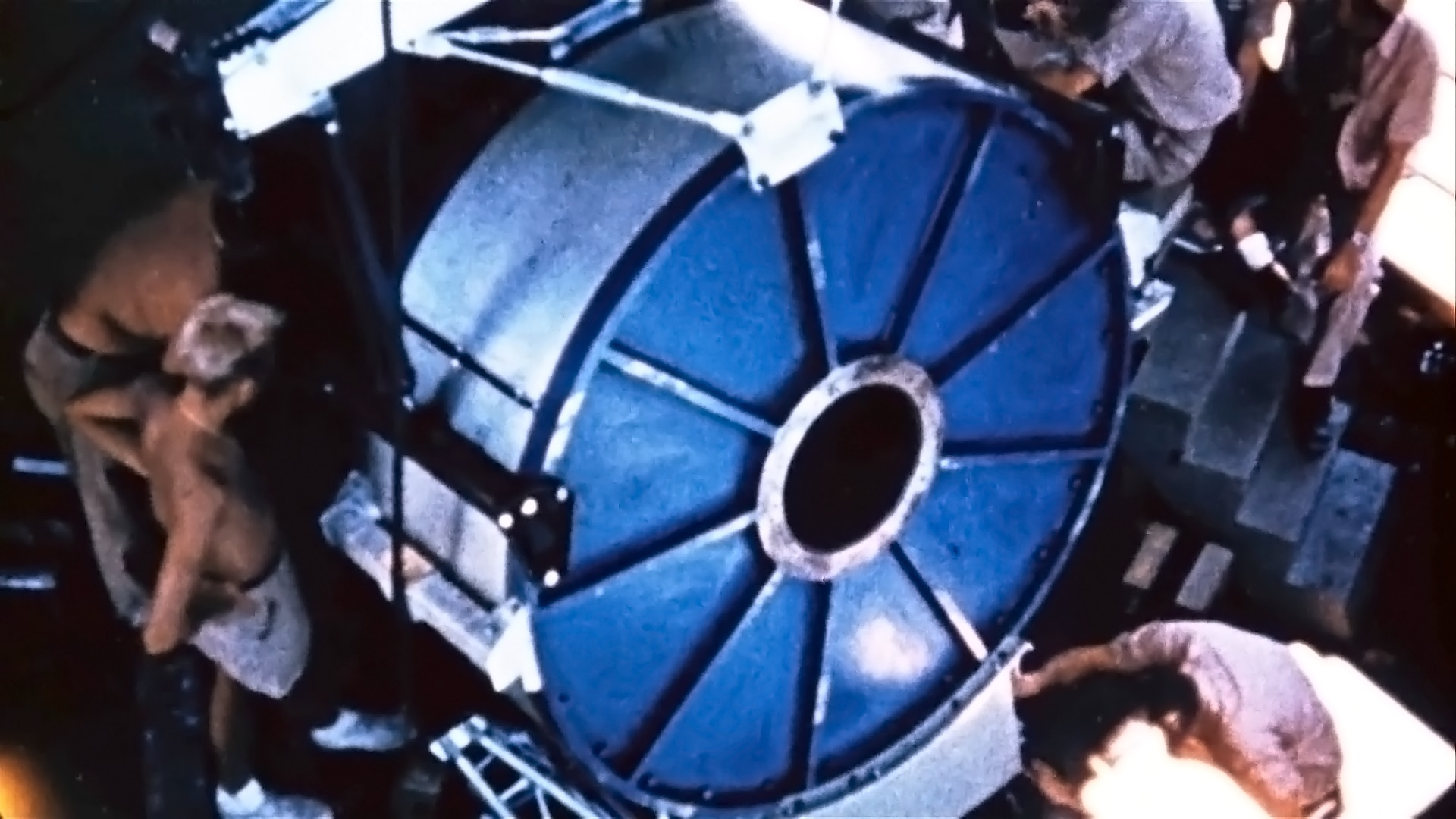
The Cylinder device for the George test

The Cylinder device was designed specifically to allow observation of the thermonuclear reaction. The fission component was a unique cylindrical implosion of a long highly enriched uranium annulus. This surrounded a beryllium oxide chamber, containing cryogenic liquid deuterium with a few percent tritium. Tritium was still scarce at the time, likely produced in the B, D, and F reactors at the Hanford Site, but deuterium–tritium fusion, around 100 times more likely than deuterium-deuterium fusion, was hoped to increase the number of DD reactions. The beryllium oxide chamber and fusion fuel was to be imploded by the fission reaction's X-ray radiation, allowing observation of the fusion plasma before it was engulfed.

The George design was a 'Classical Super' prototype with a binary triggering device based on the one patented by Klaus Fuchs and John von Neumann in 1946. Its success played a vital role in the history of the Teller–Ulam design.

== Test ==
University of California Radiation Laboratory provided the scientists for the measurement of the fusion reaction. Complex equipment was developed for isolating the fusion radiation from the simultaneous fission detonation. Vacuum pipes carried the fusion X-rays to the base of a shot tower, where K-edge filters fluoresced for optical measurement. Unshielded photographic plates were exposed to the high-energy 14 MeV fusion neutrons, and their collision with the emulsion produced signature "proton streaks".

Edward Teller pessimistically made a $5 bet with Ernest Lawrence that the device would not work i.e. thermonuclear reactions would not be detected. He paid Lawrence the following morning when the detection of 14 MeV neutrons was confirmed.

The George test had a perfect “bell” Wilson cloud formed near the top of the mushroom cloud.

The George test validated the principles which would be used for the first full-scale thermonuclear bomb test, Ivy Mike, one year later, on November 1, 1952, at Enewetak Atoll.

== Gallery ==
George explosion

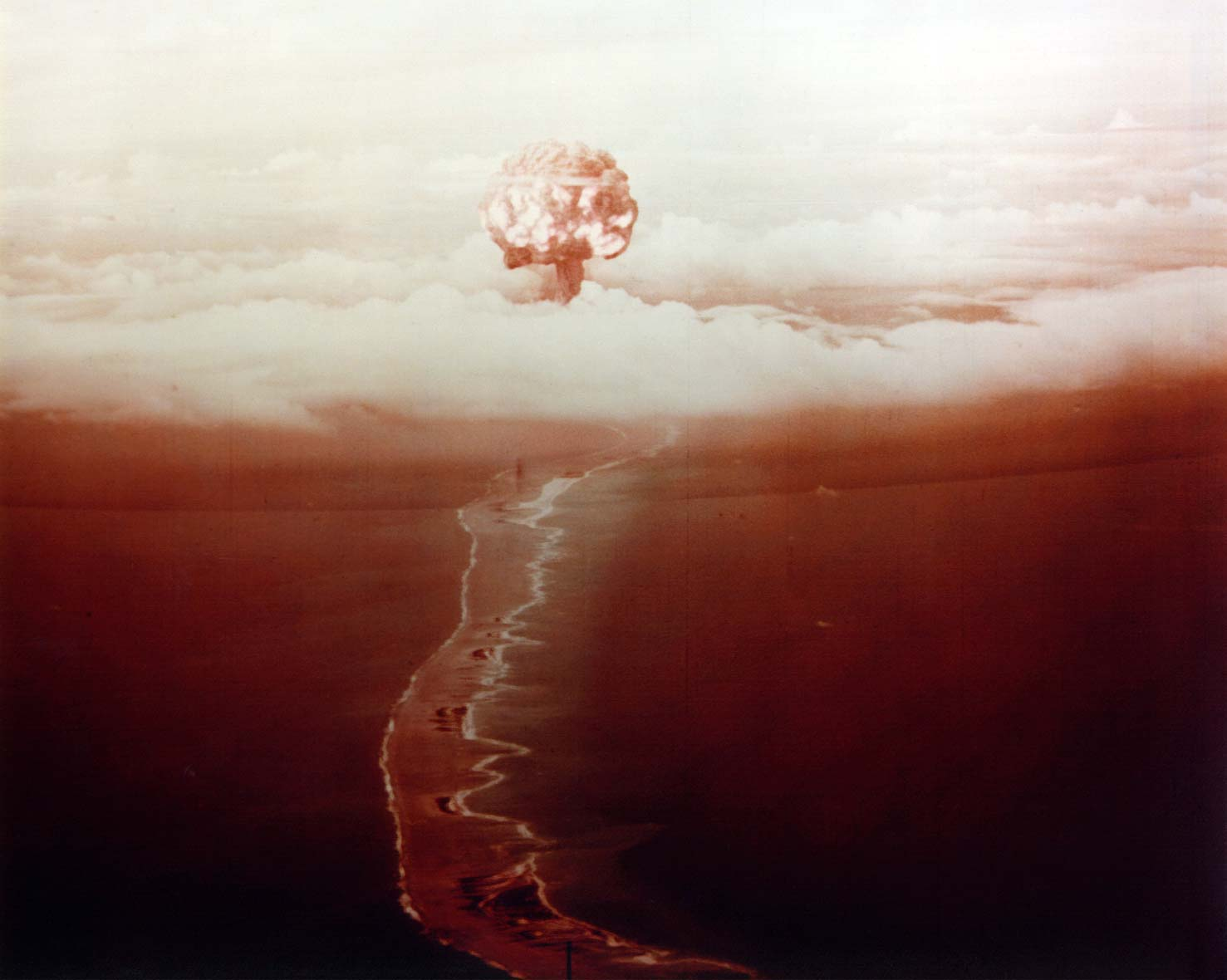
George mushroom cloud

== See also ==
- Operation Greenhouse
- Edward Teller
- Project 639 - Chinese full-scale thermonuclear test preceded by a similar demonstration yield test
