= Operation Greenhouse =

Series of 1950s American nuclear tests

- Greenhouse Item, 45.5 kilotons

Information
- Country: United States
- Test site: Ebiriru (Ruby), Enewetak Atoll; Enjebi (Janet), Enewetak Atoll; Runit (Yvonne), Enewetak Atoll
- Period: 1951
- Number of tests: 4
- Test type: tower
- Max. yield: 225 kilotonnes of TNT (940 TJ)

Test series chronology

Operation Greenhouse was the fifth American nuclear test series, the second conducted in 1951 and the first to test principles that would lead to developing thermonuclear weapons (hydrogen bombs). Conducted at the new Pacific Proving Ground, on islands of the Enewetak Atoll, it mounted the devices on large steel towers to simulate air bursts. This series of nuclear weapons tests was preceded by Operation Ranger and succeeded by Operation Buster-Jangle.

Operation Greenhouse showcased new and aggressive designs for nuclear weapons. The main idea was to reduce the size, weight, and most importantly, reduce the amount of fissile material necessary for nuclear weapons, while increasing the destructive power. With the Soviet Union's first nuclear test a year and half earlier (29 August 1949), the United States had begun stockpiling the new designs before they were actually proven. Thus the success of Operation Greenhouse was vital before the development of thermonuclear weapons could continue.

A number of target buildings, including bunkers, houses and factories were built on Mujinkarikku Islet to test nuclear weapon effects.

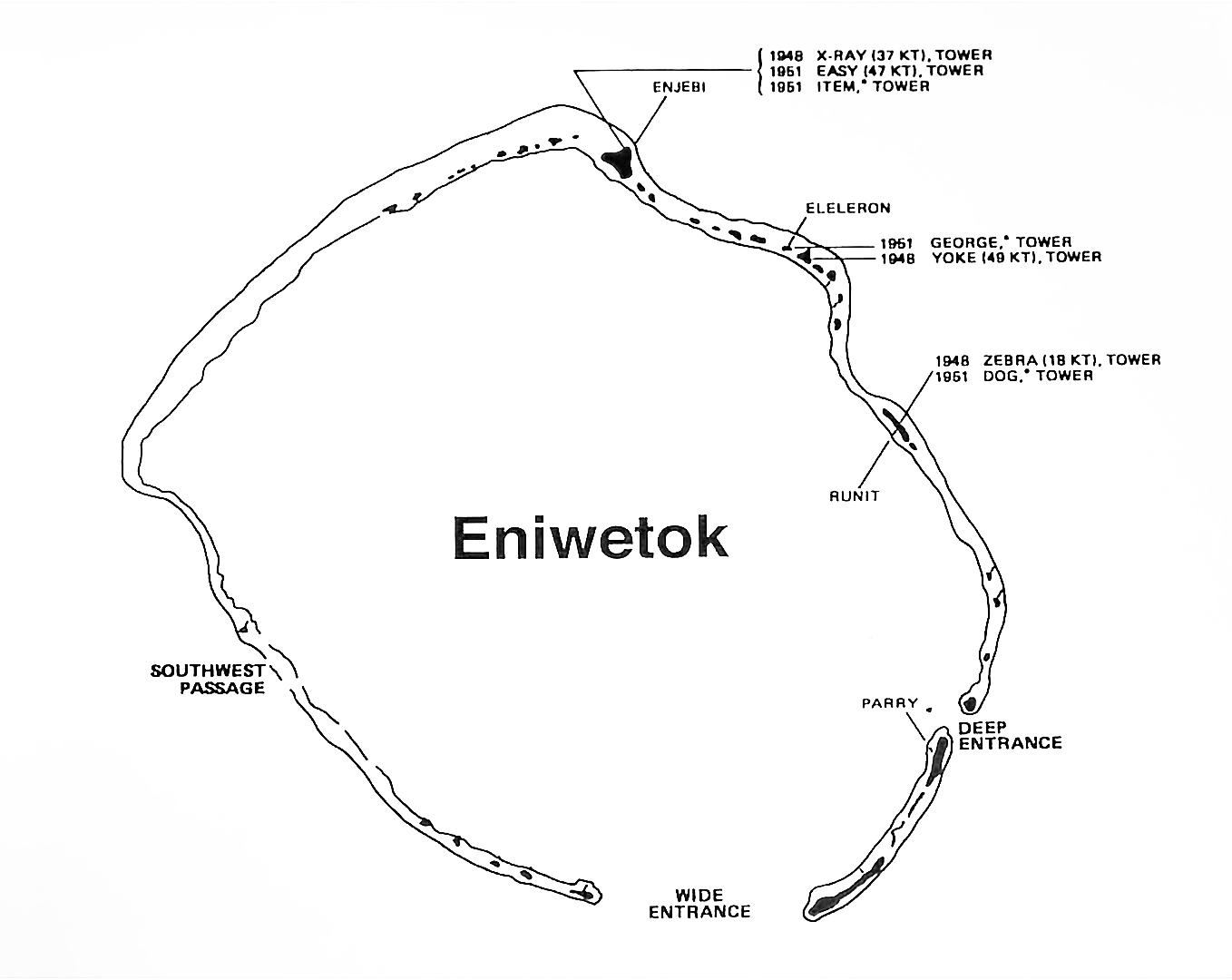
Enewetak Atoll, relative to all Operation Greenhouse test-firing locations. Also included are shot locations for the previous Operation Sandstone.

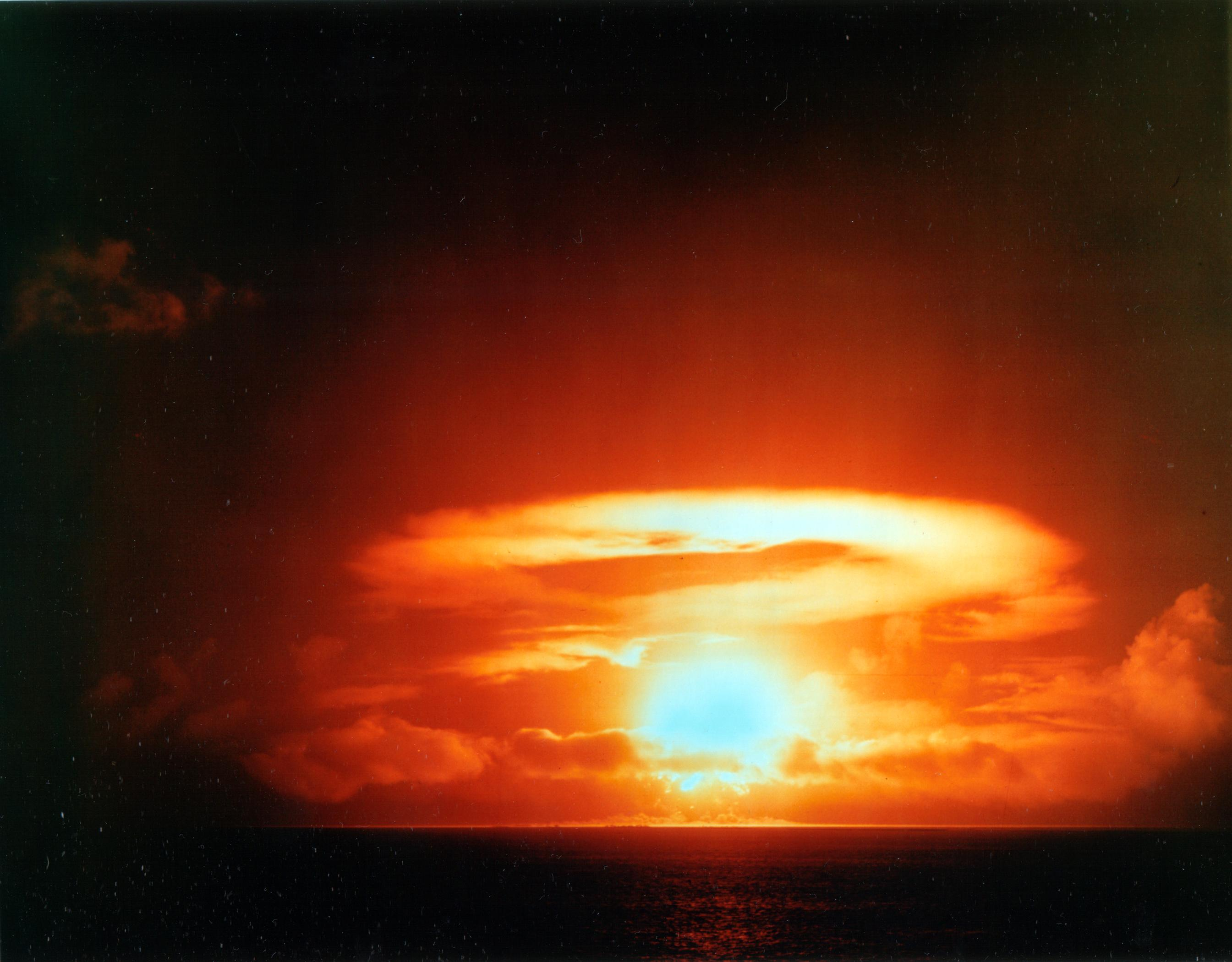
Item fireball, 45.5 kilotons

== George ==
The George explosion conducted on May 8, 1951, was the world's first thermonuclear burn. The Cylinder device was designed for probing the thermonuclear reaction. It was a test of the radiation implosion principle that was key to the recently theorized Teller-Ulam design. The vast majority of its yield derived from fission. The energy output from the thermonuclear fusion in this test was insignificant in comparison.

The fission component was a unique cylindrical implosion of a long highly enriched uranium annulus. This surrounded a beryllium oxide chamber, containing cryogenic liquid deuterium with a few percent tritium. Tritium was still scarce at the time, but deuterium–tritium fusion, around 100 times more likely than deuterium-deuterium fusion, was hoped to increase the number of DD reactions. The beryllium oxide chamber and fusion fuel was imploded by the fission reaction's X-ray radiation, allowing observation of the fusion plasma before it was engulfed.

University of California Radiation Laboratory provided the scientists for the measurement of the fusion reaction. Complex equipment was developed for isolating the fusion radiation from the simultaneous fission detonation. Vacuum pipes carried the fusion X-rays to the base of a shot tower, where K-edge filters fluoresced for optical measurement. Unshielded photographic plates were exposed to the high-energy fusion neutrons, and their collision with the emulsion produced signature "proton streaks".

The George design was a 'Classical Super' prototype with a binary triggering device based on the one patented by Klaus Fuchs and von Neumann in 1946. Its success played a vital role in the history of the Teller–Ulam design. The George test had a perfect “bell” Wilson cloud form near the top of the mushroom cloud.

The George test validated the principles which would be used for the first full-scale thermonuclear bomb test, Ivy Mike, the following year, on November 1, 1952, at Enewetak Atoll.

== Item ==
Conducted on May 25, 1951, Item was the first test of the fusion boosting principle, nearly doubling the normal yield of a similar non-boosted weapon. In this test, deuterium-tritium (D-T) gas was injected into the enriched uranium core of a nuclear fission bomb. The extreme heat of the fissioning bomb produced thermonuclear fusion reactions within the D-T gas. While the yield of George was significantly boosted by fusion neutrons, Item tested a small DT gas mixture at the center of a spherical implosion, which would eventually become standard within the nuclear arsenal.

== Dog photograph ==
The Dog explosion is more popularly known for an image taken of those viewing it than the actual explosion itself; the photograph depicts numerous VIPs wearing safety goggles sitting on Adirondack chairs while being illuminated by the flash of the detonation. This photograph takes up the bottom portion of the advertising poster for the 1995 documentary film Trinity and Beyond by Peter Kuran. The safety goggles worn by all those viewing the test in the picture have become somewhat of a museum collector's item, with a nametag on one suggesting that nuclear physicist Norman F. Ramsey may have been present. Cynthia Miller claims that her father, Van Dine, is the first man on the left in the photo. The blast wave safely arrived at the location of the VIPs some 45 seconds after the initially silent flash of the detonation as observed from their position on Parry island.

== List ==
United States' Greenhouse series tests and detonations
Name (Note: The US, France and Great Britain have code-named their test events, while the USSR and China did not, and therefore have only test numbers (with some exceptions – Soviet peaceful explosions were named). Word translations into English in parentheses unless the name is a proper noun. A dash followed by a number indicates a member of a salvo event. The US also sometimes named the individual explosions in such a salvo test, which results in "name1 – 1(with name2)". If test is canceled or aborted, then the row data like date and location discloses the intended plans, where known.)	Date time (UT)	Local time zone (Note: To convert the UT time into standard local, add the number of hours in parentheses to the UT time; for local daylight saving time, add one additional hour. If the result is earlier than 00:00, add 24 hours and subtract 1 from the day; if it is 24:00 or later, subtract 24 hours and add 1 to the day. Historical time zone data obtained from the IANA time zone database.)	Location (Note: Rough place name and a latitude/longitude reference; for rocket-carried tests, the launch location is specified before the detonation location, if known. Some locations are extremely accurate; others (like airdrops and space blasts) may be quite inaccurate. "~" indicates a likely pro-forma rough location, shared with other tests in that same area.)	Elevation + height (Note: Elevation is the ground level at the point directly below the explosion relative to sea level; height is the additional distance added or subtracted by tower, balloon, shaft, tunnel, air drop or other contrivance. For rocket bursts the ground level is "N/A". In some cases it is not clear if the height is absolute or relative to ground, for example, Plumbbob/John. No number or units indicates the value is unknown, while "0" means zero. Sorting on this column is by elevation and height added together.)	Delivery, (Note: Atmospheric, airdrop, balloon, gun, cruise missile, rocket, surface, tower, and barge are all disallowed by the Partial Nuclear Test Ban Treaty. Sealed shaft and tunnel are underground, and remained useful under the PTBT. Intentional cratering tests are borderline; they occurred under the treaty, were sometimes protested, and generally overlooked if the test was declared to be a peaceful use.) Purpose (Note: Include weapons development, weapon effects, safety test, transport safety test, war, science, joint verification and industrial/peaceful, which may be further broken down.)	Device (Note: Designations for test items where known, "?" indicates some uncertainty about the preceding value, nicknames for particular devices in quotes. This category of information is often not officially disclosed.)	Yield (Note: Estimated energy yield in tons, kilotons, and megatons. A ton of TNT equivalent is defined as 4.184 gigajoules (1 gigacalorie).)	Fallout (Note: Radioactive emission to the atmosphere aside from prompt neutrons, where known. The measured species is only iodine-131 if mentioned, otherwise it is all species. No entry means unknown, probably none if underground and "all" if not; otherwise notation for whether measured on the site only or off the site, where known, and the measured amount of radioactivity released.)	Refer- ences	Notes
Dog	April 7, 1951 17:33:57.8	MHT (11 hrs)	Runit (Yvonne), Enewetak Atoll 11.55234°N 162.34648°E	2 m (6 ft 7 in) + 91 m (299 ft)	tower, weapons development	Mk-6D	81 kt			Proof test of Mark 6, 60 point implosion. Hansen says "north end of Runit".
Easy	April 20, 1951 17:27:00.1	MHT (11 hrs)	Enjebi (Janet), Enewetak Atoll 11.66543°N 162.23379°E	2 m (6 ft 7 in) + 91 m (299 ft)	tower, weapon development and effects	TX-5D	47 kt			Proof test of Mark 5, 92 point lense implosion system, used as the primary for Ivy Mike. Mock buildings (homes, bunkers, factories) were assembled on Enjebi and Mujinkarikku Island. Hansen: "west end of Engebi".
George	May 8, 1951 20:30:00.7	MHT (11 hrs)	Ebiriru (Ruby), Enewetak Atoll 11.62703°N 162.29626°E	2 m (6 ft 7 in) + 62 m (203 ft)	tower, weapons development	"Cylinder"	225 kt			First thermonuclear burn, first test of radiation implosion principle. Unique cylindrical implosion of HEU. Central cylinder of cryogenic deuterium and few percent tritium ignited. Majority of yield from fission.
Item	May 24, 1951 17:16:59.3	MHT (11 hrs)	Enjebi (Janet), Enewetak Atoll 11.66604°N 162.24254°E	2 m (6 ft 7 in) + 62 m (203 ft)	tower, weapons development	"Booster"	45.5 kt			First test of standard boosting. DT gas mixture injected into HEU core. Yield twice that without boosting.

== Gallery ==
Greenhouse George, 225-kilotons.

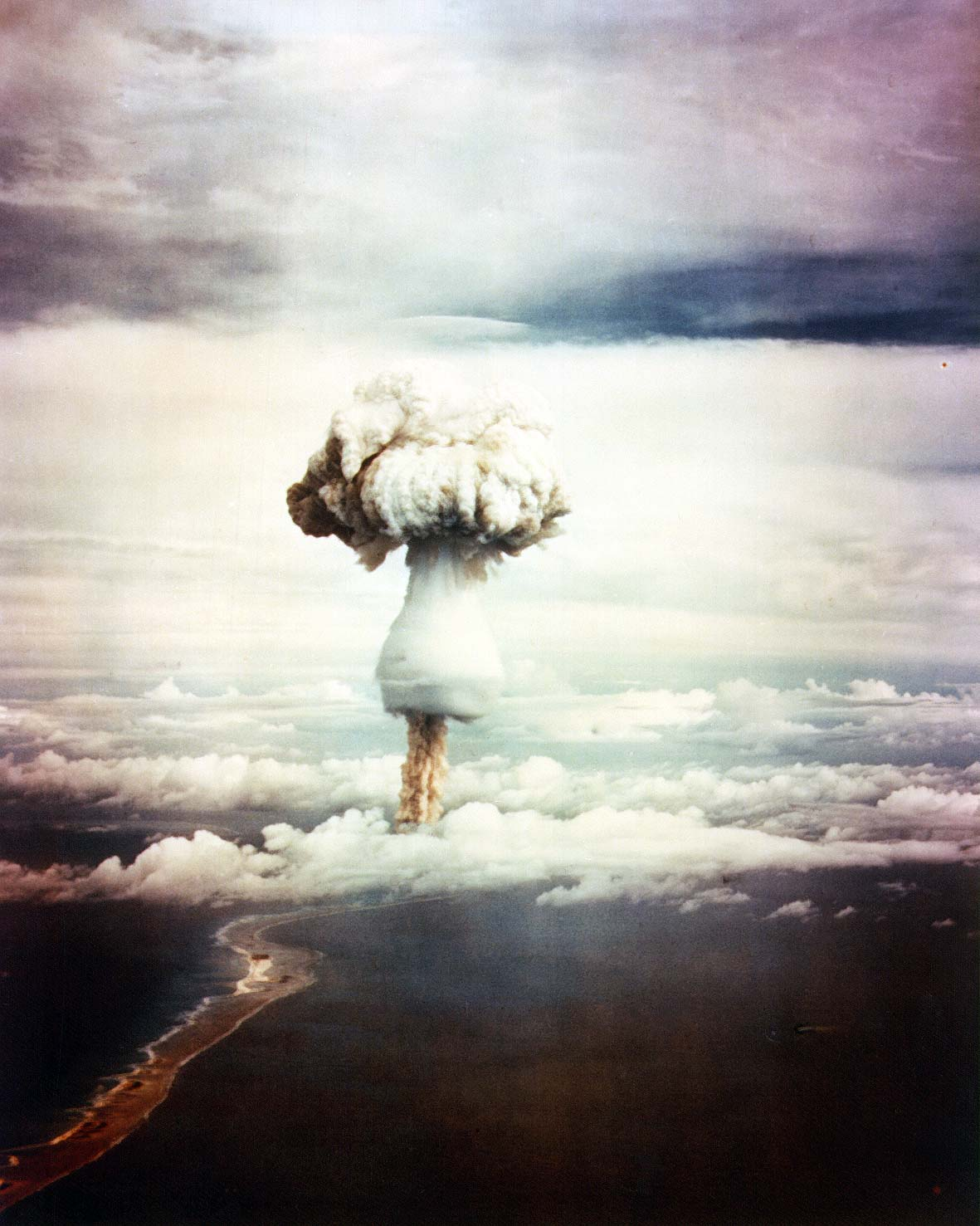
George mushroom cloud.

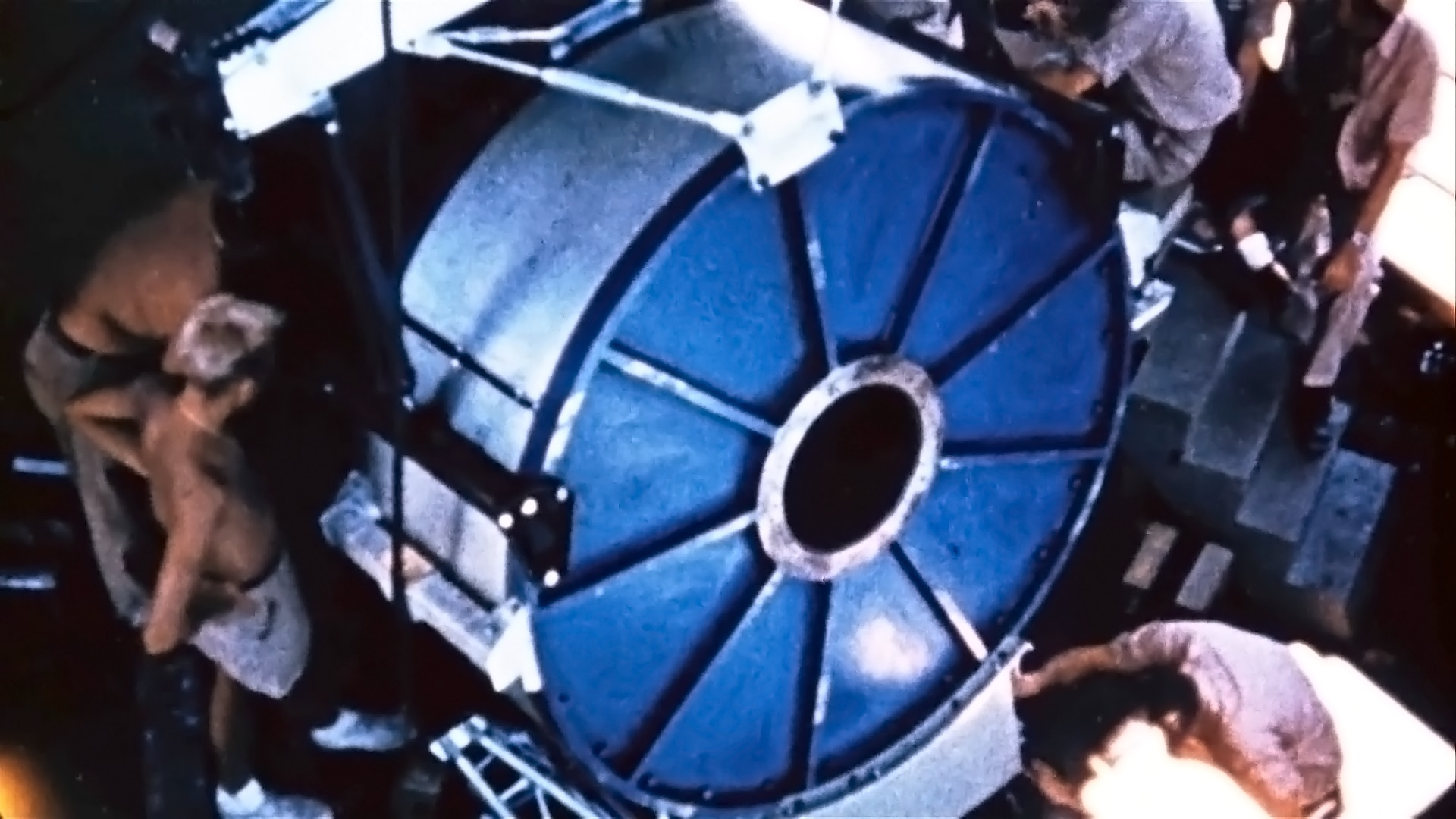
George device being mounted within its shot-tower.

Greenhouse Easy, 47-kilotons.

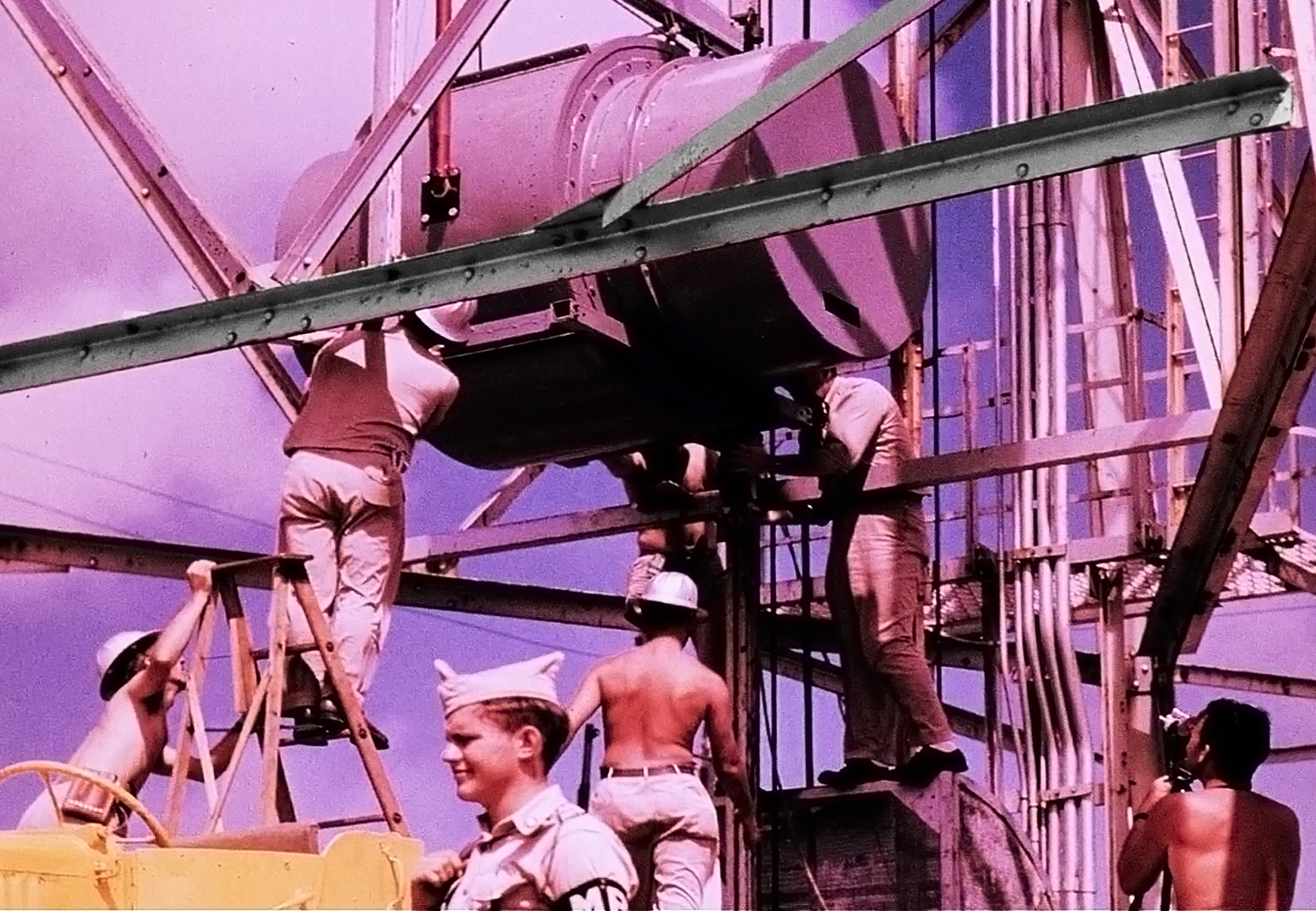
Item device being raised upward towards its shot-tower.

Greenhouse Dog, 81-kilotons.

=== Video resources ===
Joint Task Force Three - Operation Greenhouse (1951) de-classified AEC information film reel.

"Operation Greenhouse"(1951) AEC official preliminary test footage.

== See also ==
- Trinity and Beyond
