= Boosted fission weapon =

Type of nuclear weapon

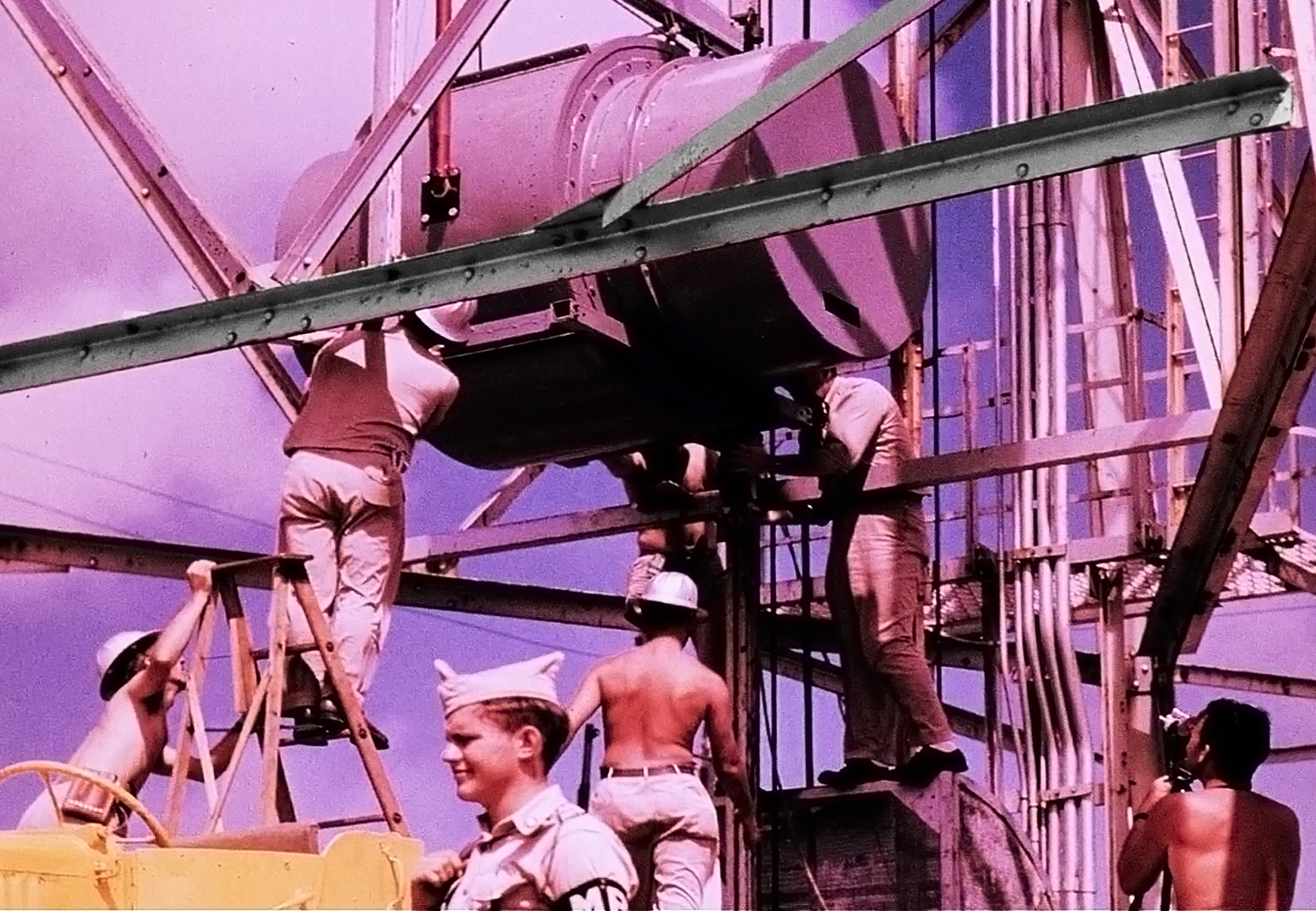
The first boosted fission device, Greenhouse Item, before testing in 1951

A boosted fission weapon is a type of nuclear weapon that makes use of a small amount of fusion fuel to increase the rate, and thus yield, of a nuclear fission reaction. The fast neutrons released by the fusion reactions add to the fast neutrons released by the fission reactions, allowing for more neutron-induced fission reactions to take place. The rate of fission is thereby greatly increased such that much more of the fissile material undergoes fission before the core explosively disassembles. The fuel is commonly a 50-50 deuterium-tritium gas mixture. The fusion process itself adds only a small amount of energy to the process, perhaps 1%.

The primary benefit of boosting is further miniaturization of nuclear weapons as it reduces the minimum inertial confinement time required for a supercritical nuclear explosion by providing a sudden influx of fast neutrons before the critical mass would blow itself apart. While the bulky Fat Man had a diameter of 5 feet (1.5 m) and required 3 tons of high explosives for implosion, a boosted fission primary can be fitted on a small nuclear warhead (such as the W88) to ignite the thermonuclear secondary.

The idea of boosting was originally developed between late 1947 and late 1949 at Los Alamos National Laboratory. It was boosting, mainly, that was responsible for the 100-fold increase in the efficiency of fission weapons between 1947 and 1971.

== Gas boosting ==
In a fission bomb, the fissile fuel is "assembled" quickly by a uniform spherical implosion created with conventional explosives, producing a supercritical mass. In this state, many of the neutrons released by the fissioning of a nucleus will induce fission of other nuclei in the fuel mass, also releasing additional neutrons, leading to a chain reaction. This reaction consumes at most 20% of the fuel before the bomb blows itself apart, or possibly much less if conditions are not ideal: the Little Boy (gun type mechanism) and Fat Man (implosion type mechanism) bombs had efficiencies of 1.38% and 13%, respectively.

Fusion boosting is achieved by introducing tritium and deuterium gas. Solid lithium deuteride-tritide has also been used in some cases, but gas allows more flexibility (and can be stored externally) and can be injected into a hollow cavity at the center of the sphere of fission fuel, or into a gap between an outer layer and a "levitated" inner core, sometime before implosion. By the time about 1% of the fission fuel has fissioned, the temperature rises high enough to cause thermonuclear fusion, which produces relatively large numbers of high-energy neutrons. This influx of neutrons speeds up the late stages of the chain reaction, causing approximately twice as much of the fissile material to fission before the explosion disassembles the critical mass.

Deuterium-tritium fusion neutrons are extremely energetic, seven times more energetic than an average fission neutron, which makes them much more likely to be captured in the fissile material and lead to fission. This is due to several reasons:

1. When these energetic neutrons strike a fissile nucleus, the fission releases a much larger number of secondary neutrons (e.g. 4.6 vs 2.9 for ^{239}Pu).
2. The likelihood of these neutrons interacting with a fissile nucleus is higher than for lower-energy neutrons typical of a fission reaction; the area of the plutonium or uranium nucleus where an 'impact' will lead to fission is much larger. More formally, the fission cross section is larger for higher-energy neutrons, both in absolute terms and in proportion to the scattering and capture cross sections.

Consequently, the time for the neutron population in the core to double is reduced by a factor of about 8. A sense of the potential contribution of fusion boosting can be gained by observing that the complete fusion of one mole of tritium (3 grams) and one mole of deuterium (2 grams) would produce one mole of neutrons (1 gram), which, neglecting escape losses and scattering, could fission one mole (239 grams) of plutonium directly, producing 4.6 moles of secondary neutrons, which can in turn fission another 4.6 moles of plutonium (1,099 g). The fission of this 1,338 g of plutonium in the first two generations would release 23 kilotons of TNT equivalent (97 TJ) of energy, and would by itself result in a 29.7% efficiency for a bomb containing 4.5 kg of plutonium (a typical small fission trigger). The energy released by the fusion of the 5 g of fusion fuel itself is only 1.73% of the energy released by the fission of 1,338 g of plutonium. Larger total yields and higher efficiency are possible, since the chain reaction can continue beyond the second generation after fusion boosting.

Fusion-boosted fission bombs can also be made immune to neutron radiation from nearby nuclear explosions, which can cause other designs to predetonate, blowing themselves apart without achieving a high yield. The combination of reduced weight in relation to yield and immunity to radiation has ensured that most modern nuclear weapons are fusion-boosted.

The fusion reaction rate typically becomes significant at 20 to 30 megakelvins. This temperature is reached at very low efficiencies, when less than 1% of the fissile material has fissioned (corresponding to a yield in the range of hundreds of tons of TNT). Since implosion weapons can be designed that will achieve yields in this range even if neutrons are present at the moment of criticality, fusion boosting allows the manufacture of efficient weapons that are immune to predetonation. Elimination of this hazard is a very important advantage in using boosting. It appears that every weapon now in the U.S. arsenal is a boosted design.

Tritium is a radioactive isotope with a half-life of 12.3 years. Its main decay product is helium-3, which is among the nuclides with the largest cross-section for neutron capture. Therefore, periodically the weapon must have its helium waste flushed out and its tritium supply recharged. This is because any helium-3 in the weapon's tritium supply would act as a neutron poison during the weapon's detonation, absorbing neutrons meant to collide with the nuclei of its fission fuel.

== 'Layer Cake' devices ==
Some early boosted fission designs such as the Joe-4, the Soviet "Layer Cake" ("Sloika", Russian: Слойка), used large amounts of fusion to induce fission in the uranium-238 atoms that make up depleted uranium. These weapons had a fissile core surrounded by a layer of lithium-6 deuteride, in turn surrounded by a layer of depleted uranium. Some designs (including the layer cake) had several alternate layers of these materials. The Soviet Layer Cake was similar to the American Alarm Clock design, which was never built, and the British Green Bamboo design, which was built but never tested.

When this type of bomb explodes, the fission of the highly enriched uranium or plutonium core creates neutrons, some of which escape and strike atoms of lithium-6, creating tritium. At the temperature created by fission in the core, tritium and deuterium can undergo thermonuclear fusion without a high level of compression. The fusion of tritium and deuterium produces a neutron with an energy of 14 MeV—a much higher energy than the 1 MeV of the neutron that began the reaction. This creation of high-energy neutrons, rather than energy yield, is the main purpose of fusion in this kind of weapon. This 14 MeV neutron then strikes an atom of uranium-238, causing fission: without this fusion stage, the original 1 MeV neutron hitting an atom of uranium-238 would probably have just been absorbed. This fission then releases energy and also neutrons, which then create more tritium from the remaining lithium-6, and so on, in a continuous cycle. Energy from fission of uranium-238 is useful in weapons: both because depleted uranium is much cheaper than highly enriched uranium and because it cannot go critical and is therefore less likely to be involved in a catastrophic accident.

This type of device can produce up to 20% of its yield from fusion, with the rest coming from fission, and is limited in yield by practical concerns of mass and diameter to less than one megaton of TNT (4 PJ) equivalent. Joe-4 yielded 400 kilotons of TNT (1.7 PJ). In comparison, a "true" hydrogen bomb, such as the Soviet Tsar Bomba, could produce up to 97% of its yield from fusion, and its explosive yield is limited only by device size.

== Boosted fission tests by nation ==
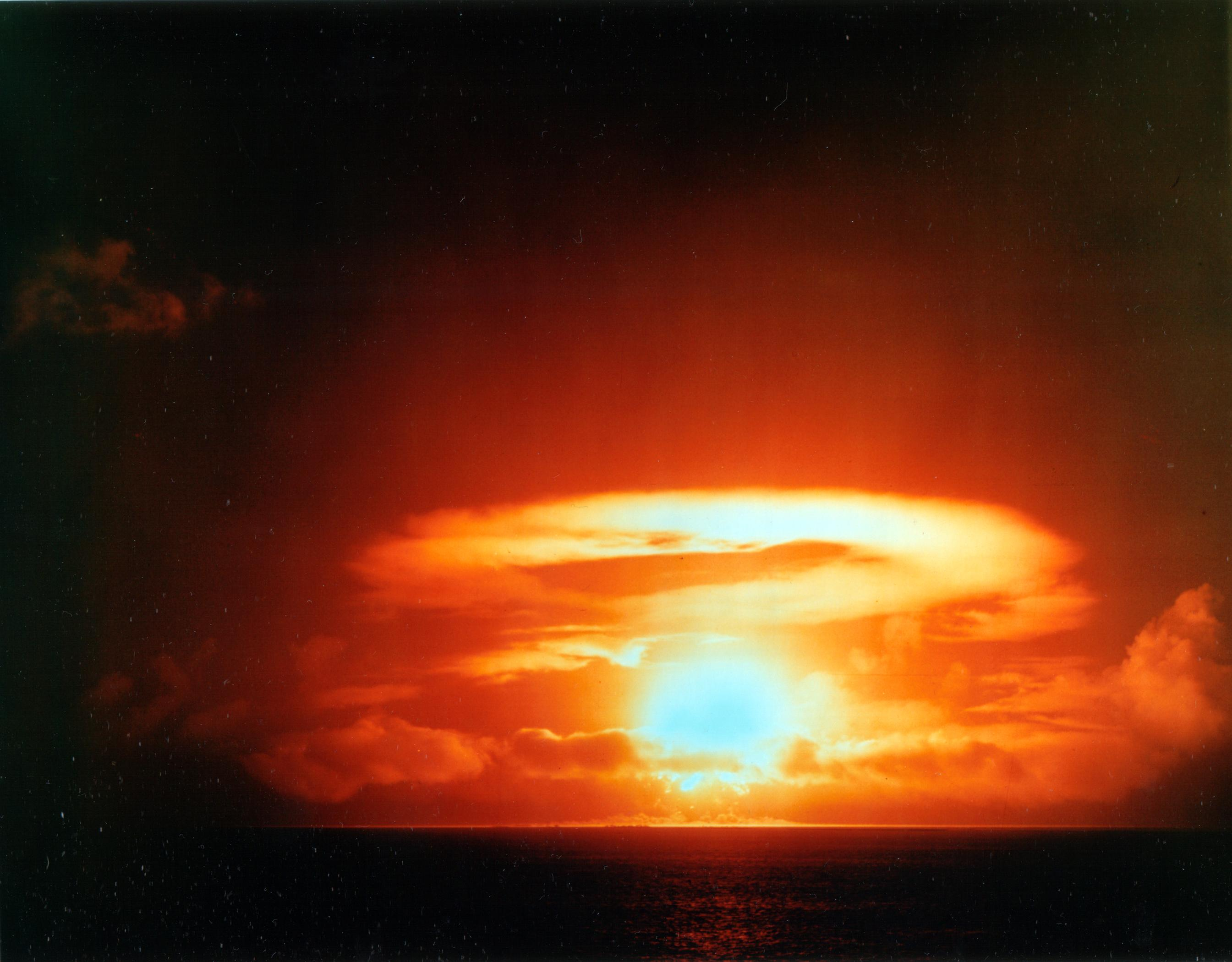
Greenhouse Item atmospheric test, May 25, 1951

Multiple nations have demonstrated devices using boosted fission:

Country	Test series	Test	Year	Yield (kt)	Device type
United States	Greenhouse	Item	1951	45.5	Gas boosted
Soviet Union		RDS-6s	1953	400	Layer cake
United Kingdom	Mosaic	G1	1956	15-20	Layer cake
China		596L	1966	220	Layer cake
France	1966–70	Rigel	1966	125	
Pakistan	Chagai	Chagai-I	1998	35-40	Gas boosted

== See also ==
- Nuclear weapon design
