= List of nuclear weapons tests =

The radiation warning symbol (trefoil).

Nuclear weapons testing is the act of experimentally and deliberately firing one or more nuclear devices in a controlled manner pursuant to a military, scientific or technological goal. This has been done on test sites on land or waters owned, controlled or leased from the owners by one of the eight nuclear nations: the United States, the Soviet Union, the United Kingdom, France, China, India, Pakistan and North Korea, or has been done on or over ocean sites far from territorial waters. There have been 2,121 tests done since the first in July 1945, involving 2,476 nuclear devices. As of 1993, worldwide, 520 atmospheric nuclear explosions (including eight underwater) have been conducted with a total yield of 545 megatons (Mt): 217 Mt from pure fission and 328 Mt from bombs using fusion, while the estimated number of underground nuclear tests conducted in the period from 1957 to 1992 is 1,352 explosions with a total yield of 90 Mt. As a result of the 1996 Comprehensive Nuclear-Test-Ban Treaty, there were no declared tests between the 1998 Pakistani Chagai-II and the 2006 North Korean test, and none outside North Korea to date.

Very few unknown tests are suspected at this time, the Vela incident being the most prominent. Israel is the only country suspected of having nuclear weapons but not confirmed to have ever tested any.

The following are considered nuclear tests:

- Single nuclear devices fired in deep horizontal tunnels (drifts) or in vertical shafts, in shallow shafts ("cratering"), underwater, on barges or vessels on the water, on land, in towers, carried by balloons, shot from cannons, dropped from airplanes with or without parachutes, and shot into a ballistic trajectory, into high atmosphere or into near space on rockets. Since 1963 the great majority have been underground due to the Partial Test Ban Treaty.
- Salvo tests in which several devices are fired simultaneously, as defined by international treaties:

In conformity with treaties between the United States and the Soviet Union, ... For nuclear weapon tests, a salvo is defined as two or more underground nuclear explosions conducted at a test site within an area delineated by a circle having a diameter of two kilometers and conducted within a total period of time of 0.1 seconds.

- The two nuclear bombs dropped in combat over Japan in 1945. While the primary purpose of these two detonations was military and not experimental, observations were made and the tables would be incomplete without them.
- Nuclear safety tests in which the nuclear yield was intended to be zero, and which failed to some extent if a nuclear yield was detected. There have been failures, and therefore they are included in the lists, as well as the successes.
- Fizzles, in which the expected yield was not reached.
- Tests intended but not completed because of vehicle or other support failures that destroyed the device.
- Tests that were emplaced and could not be fired for various reasons. Usually, the devices were ultimately destroyed by later conventional or nuclear explosions.

Not included as nuclear tests:

- Misfires which were corrected and later fired as intended.
- Hydro-nuclear or subcritical testing in which the normal fuel material for a nuclear device is below the amount necessary to sustain a chain reaction. The line here is finely drawn, but, among other things, subcritical testing is not prohibited by the Comprehensive Nuclear Test Ban Treaty, while safety tests are.

== Tests by country ==
The table in this section summarizes all worldwide nuclear testing (including the two bombs dropped in combat which were not tests). The country names are links to summary articles for each country, which may in turn be used to drill down to test series articles which contain details on every known nuclear explosion and test. The notes attached to various table cells detail how the numbers therein are arrived at.

Worldwide nuclear testing totals by country
Country	Tests (Note: Including salvo tests counted as a single test.)	Devices fired (Note: Detonations include zero-yield detonations in safety tests and failed full yield tests, but not those in the accident category listed above.)	Devices w/ unknown yields (Note: The number of detonations for which the yield is unknown.)	Peaceful use tests (Note: As declared so by the nation testing; some may have been dual use.)	Non-PTBT tests (Note: Tests which violate the PTBT – atmospheric, surface, barge, space, and underwater tests.)	Yield range (kilotons)	Total yield (kilotons)	Percentage by tests	Percentage by yield
US	1,032 (Note: Including five tests in which the devices were destroyed before detonation by rocket failures, and the combat bombs dropped on Japan in World War II)	1,132	12	27 (Note: Includes both application tests and research tests at NTS.) (Operation Plowshare)	231	0 to 15,000	196,514 (Note: When a test yield reads "< number kt" (like "< 20 kt") this total scores the yield as half the stated maximum, i.e., 10 kt in this example.)	48.7%	36.3%
USSR	727 (Note: Includes the test device left behind in Semipalatinsk and 11 apparent failures not in the official list, but included in list in reference following:)	981	248	156 (Note: 124 applications tests and 32 research tests which helped design better PNE charges.) (Nuclear Explosions for the National Economy)	229	0 to 50,000	296,837	34.4%	54.9%
UK	88 (Note: Includes the 43 Vixen tests, which were safety tests.)	88	31	0	21	0 to 3,000	9,282	4.15%	1.72%
France	215 (Note: Including 5 Pollen plutonium dispersal tests near at Adrar Tikertine near In Ekker, and two possible safety tests in 1978, listed in reference following:)	215	0	4 (Note: Four of the tests at In Ekker were the focus of attention at APEX (Application pacifique des expérimentations nucléaires). They gave the tests different names, causing some confusion.)	57	0 to 2,600	13,567	10.2%	2.51%
China	47 (Note: Includes one test destroyed before detonation by a failed parachute, and two which are unlisted in most sources, but are listed in the reference following:)	48	7	0	23	0 to 4,000	24,409	2.22%	4.51%
India	2	6	0	1 (Note: Indira Gandhi, in her capacity as India's Minister of Atomic Energy at the time, declared the Smiling Buddha test to have been a test for the peaceful uses of atomic power.)	0	0 to 60	70	0.141%	0.013%
Pakistan	2	6 (Note: There is some uncertainty as to exactly how many bombs were exploded in each of Pakistan's tests. It could be as low as three altogether or as high as six.)	0	0	0	1 to 45	51	0.107%	0.0094%
North Korea	6	6	0	0	0	1 to 250	197.8	0.283%	0.036%
Total	2,121	2,476	294	188	604	0 to 50,000	540,849		

== Known tests ==
In the following subsections, a selection of significant tests (by no means exhaustive) is listed, representative of the testing effort in each nuclear country.

=== United States ===
The standard official list of tests for American devices is arguably the United States Department of Energy DoE-209 document. The United States conducted around 1,054 nuclear tests (by official count) between 1945 and 1992, including 216 atmospheric, underwater, and space tests. Some significant tests conducted by the United States include:

Shot "Baker" of Operation Crossroads (1946) was the first underwater nuclear explosion.

- The Trinity test on 16 July 1945, near Socorro, New Mexico, was the first-ever test of a nuclear weapon (yield of around 20 kilotons).
- The Operation Crossroads series in July 1946, at Bikini Atoll in the Marshall Islands, was the first postwar test series and one of the largest military operations in U.S. history.
- Operation Sandstone,Yoke nuclear device detonation. 1948
  The Operation Sandstone test series conducted in April and May 1948 at Eniwetok Atoll in the Marshall Islands, was a critical step in advancing nuclear weapons development. Overseen by Joint Task Force 7 (JTF-7), the operation consisted of three atomic detonations, X-RAY, YOKE, and ZEBRA designed to evaluate new bomb designs with increased efficiency and improved fissile material usage.
- The Operation Ranger test series was the fourth American nuclear test operation. It was conducted between January 27th and February 6th, 1951 and was the first series to be carried out at the Nevada Test Site. All the bombs were dropped by B-50D bombers and exploded in the open air over Frenchman Flat (Area 5).
- The Operation Greenhouse shots of May 1951, at Enewetak Atoll in the Marshall Islands, included the first boosted fission weapon test (named Item) and a scientific test (named George) which proved the feasibility of thermonuclear weapons.
- The Ivy Mike shot of 1 November 1952, at Enewetak Atoll, was the first full test of a Teller-Ulam design staged hydrogen bomb, with a yield of 10 megatons. This was not a deployable weapon. With its full cryogenic equipment it weighed about 82 tons.
- The Castle Bravo shot of 1 March 1954, at Bikini Atoll, was the first test of a deployable (solid fuel) thermonuclear weapon, and also (accidentally) the largest weapon ever tested by the United States (15 megatons). It was also the single largest U.S. radiological accident in connection with nuclear testing. The unanticipated yield, and a change in the weather, resulted in nuclear fallout spreading eastward onto the inhabited Rongelap and Rongerik atolls, which were soon evacuated. Many of the Marshall Islands natives have since suffered from birth defects and have received some compensation from the federal government of the United States. A Japanese fishing boat, the Daigo Fukuryū Maru, also came into contact with the fallout, which caused many of the crew to grow ill; one eventually died. The crew's exposure was referenced in the film Godzilla as a criticism of American nuclear tests in the Pacific.
- The Operation Plumbbob series of May–October 1957 is considered the biggest, longest, and most controversial test series that occurred within the continental United States. Rainier Mesa, Frenchman Flat, and Yucca Flat were all used for the 29 different atmospheric explosions.
- Shot Argus I of Operation Argus, on 27 August 1958, was the first detonation of a nuclear weapon in outer space when a 1.7-kiloton warhead was detonated at 200 kilometers altitude over the South Atlantic Ocean during a series of high-altitude nuclear explosions.
- Operation Dominic, Sunset bomb detonation.
  Shot Frigate Bird of Operation Dominic on 6 May 1962, was the only U.S. test of an operational ballistic missile with a live nuclear warhead (yield of 600 kilotons), at Johnston Atoll in the Pacific. In general, missile systems were tested without live warheads and warheads were tested separately for safety concerns. In the early 1960s there were mounting questions about how the systems would behave under combat conditions (when they were mated, in military parlance), and this test was meant to dispel these concerns. However, the warhead had to be somewhat modified before its use, and the missile was only a SLBM (and not an ICBM), so by itself, it did not satisfy all concerns.
- Shot Sedan of Operation Storax on 6 July 1962 (yield of 104 kilotons), was an attempt at showing the feasibility of using nuclear weapons for civilian, peaceful purposes as part of Operation Plowshare. In this instance, a 1280-feet-in-diameter and 320-feet-deep explosion crater, morphologically similar to an impact crater, was created at the Nevada Test Site.
- Shot Divider of Operation Julin on 23 September 1992, at the Nevada Test Site, was the last U.S. nuclear test. Described as a "test to ensure safety of deterrent forces", the series was interrupted by the beginning of negotiations over the Comprehensive Nuclear-Test-Ban Treaty.

=== Soviet Union ===
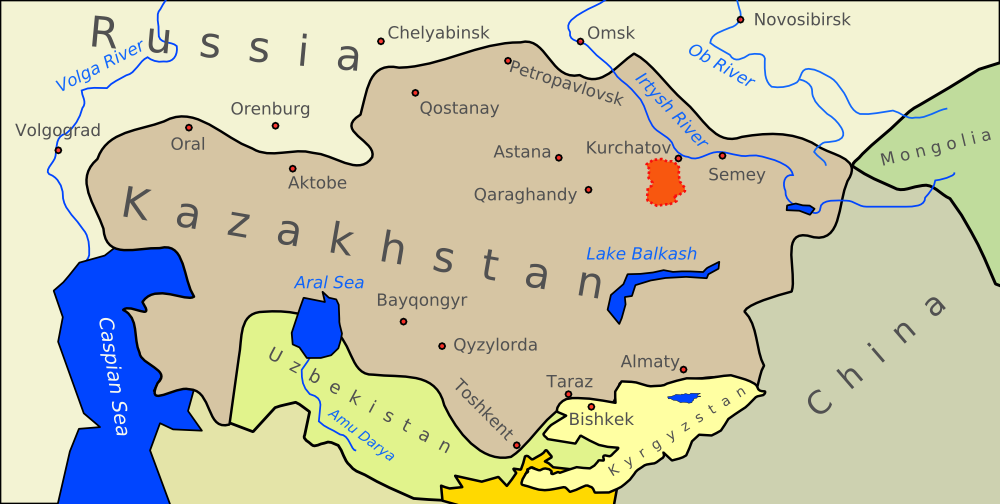
The 18,000 km^{2} expanse of the Semipalatinsk Test Site (indicated in red), attached to Kurchatov (along the Irtysh river), and near Semey, as well as Karagandy, and Astana. The site comprised an area the size of Wales.

After the fall of the USSR, the American government (as a member of the International Consortium International Science and Technology Center) hired top scientists in Sarov (aka Arzamas-16, the Soviet equivalent of Los Alamos and thus sometimes called Los Arzamas) to draft documents about the history of the Soviet atomic program. One of the documents was the definitive list of Soviet nuclear tests. Most of the tests have no code names, unlike the American tests, so they are known by their test numbers from this document. Some list compilers have detected discrepancies in that list; one device was abandoned in its cove in a tunnel in Semipalatinsk when the Soviets abandoned Kazakhstan, and one list lists 13 other tests which apparently failed to provide any yield. The source for that was the well respected Russian Strategic Nuclear Forces which confirms 11 of the 13; those 11 are in the Wikipedia lists.

The Soviet Union conducted 715 nuclear tests (by the official count) between 1949 and 1990, including 219 atmospheric, underwater, and space tests. Most of them took place at the Semipalatinsk Test Site in Kazakhstan and the Northern Test Site at Novaya Zemlya. Additional industrial tests were conducted at various locations in Russia and Kazakhstan, while a small number of tests were conducted in Ukraine, Uzbekistan, and Turkmenistan.

In addition, the large-scale military exercise was conducted by Soviet army to explore the possibility of defensive and offensive warfare operations on the nuclear battlefield. The exercise, under code name of Snezhok (Snowball), involved detonation of a nuclear bomb twice as powerful as the one used in Nagasaki and approximately 45,000 soldiers coming through the epicenter immediately after the blast The exercise was conducted on September 14, 1954, under command of Marshal Georgy Zhukov to the north of Totskoye village in Orenburg Oblast, Russia.

Some significant Soviet tests include:

- Operation First Lightning/RDS-1 (known as Joe 1 in the West), August 29, 1949: first Soviet nuclear test.
- RDS-6s (known as Joe 4 in the West), August 12, 1953: first Soviet thermonuclear test using a sloyka (layer cake) design. The design proved to be unscalable into megaton yields, but it was air-deployable.
- RDS-37, November 22, 1955: first Soviet multi-megaton, true hydrogen bomb test using Andrei Sakharov's third idea, essentially a re-invention of the Teller-Ulam.
- Tsar Bomba, October 30, 1961: largest nuclear weapon ever detonated, with a design yield of 100 Mt, de-rated to 50 Mt for the test drop.
- Chagan, January 15, 1965: large cratering experiment as part of Nuclear Explosions for the National Economy program, which created an artificial lake.

The last Soviet test took place on October 24, 1990. After the dissolution of the USSR in 1992, Ukraine and Russia inherited the USSR's nuclear stockpile, though Ukraine later handed theirs over to the latter, while Kazakhstan inherited the Semipalatinsk nuclear test area, as well as the Baikonur Cosmodrome, the Sary Shagan missile/radar test area and three ballistic missile fields. Semipalatinsk included at least the one unexploded device, later blown up with conventional explosives by a combined US–Kazakh team. No testing has occurred in the former territory of the USSR since its dissolution.

=== United Kingdom ===
The United Kingdom has conducted 45 tests (12 in Australian territory, including 3 in the Montebello Islands of Western Australia and 9 in mainland South Australia (7 at Maralinga and 2 at Emu Field); 9 in the Line Islands of the central Pacific (3 at Malden Island and 6 at Kiritimati/Christmas Island); and 24 in the U.S. as part of joint test series). Often excluded from British totals are the 31 safety tests of Operation Vixen in Maralinga. British test series include:

- Operation Hurricane, October 3, 1952 (UK's first atomic bomb)
- Operation Totem, 1953
- Operation Mosaic, 1956
- Operation Buffalo, 1956
- Operation Antler, 1957
- Operation Grapple, 1957–1958 (Included the UK's first hydrogen bomb, Grapple X/Round C)

Last test: Julin Bristol, November 26, 1991, vertical shaft.

Atmospheric tests involving nuclear material but conventional explosions:

- Operation Kittens, 1953–1961 (initiator tests using conventional explosive)
- Operation Rats, 1956–1960 (conventional explosions to study dispersal of uranium)
- Operation Tims, 1955–1963 (conventional explosions for tamper, plutonium compression trials)
- Operation Vixen, 1959–1963 (effects of accidental fire or explosion on nuclear weapons)

=== France ===
France conducted 210 nuclear tests between February 13, 1960 and January 27, 1996. Four were tested at Reggane, French Algeria, 13 at In Ekker, Algeria and the rest at Moruroa and Fangataufa Atolls in French Polynesia. Often skipped in lists are the 5 safety tests at Adrar Tikertine in Algeria.

- Operation Gerboise bleue, February 13, 1960 (first atomic bomb) and three more: Reggane, Algeria; in the atmosphere; final test reputed to be more intended to prevent the weapon from falling into the hands of generals rebelling against French colonial rule than for testing purposes.
- Operation Agathe, November 7, 1961 and 12 more: In Ekker, Algeria; underground
- Operation Aldébaran, July 2, 1966 and 45 more: Moruroa and Fangataufa; in the atmosphere;
  - Canopus first hydrogen bomb: August 24, 1968 (Fangataufa)
- Operation Achille June 5, 1975 and 146 more: Moruroa and Fangataufa; underground
  - Operation Xouthos last test: January 27, 1996 (Fangataufa)

=== China ===
The foremost list of Chinese tests compiled by the Federation of American Scientists skips over two Chinese tests listed by others. The People's Republic of China conducted 45 tests (23 atmospheric and 22 underground, all conducted at Lop Nur Nuclear Weapons Test Base, in Malan, Xinjiang)

- 596 First test – October 16, 1964
- Film is now available of 1966 tests here at time 09:00 and another test later in this film.
- Test No. 6, First hydrogen bomb test – June 17, 1967
- CHIC-16, 200 kt-1 Mt atmospheric test – June 17, 1974
- #21, Largest hydrogen bomb tested by China (4 megatons) - November 17, 1976
- #29, Last atmospheric test – October 16, 1980. This is to date the last atmospheric nuclear test by any country.
- #45, Last test – July 29, 1996, underground.

=== India ===
India announced it had conducted a test of a single device in 1974 near Pakistan's eastern border under the codename Operation Smiling Buddha. After 24 years, India publicly announced five further nuclear tests on May 11 and May 13, 1998. The official number of Indian nuclear tests is six, conducted under two different code-names and at different times.

- May 18, 1974: Operation Smiling Buddha (type: implosion, plutonium and underground).
- May 11, 1998: Operation Shakti (type: implosion, 3 uranium and 2 plutonium devices, all underground).

=== Pakistan ===
Pakistan conducted 6 official tests, under 2 different code names, in the final week of May 1998. From 1983 to 1994, around 24 nuclear cold tests were carried out by Pakistan; these remained unannounced and classified until 2000. In May 1998, Pakistan responded publicly by testing 6 nuclear devices.

- March 11, 1983: Kirana-I (type: implosion, non-fissioned (plutonium) and underground). The 24 underground cold tests of nuclear devices were performed near the Sargodha Air Force Base.
- May 28, 1998: Chagai-I (type: implosion, HEU and underground). One underground horizontal-shaft tunnel test (inside a granite mountain) of boosted fission devices at Koh Kambaran in the Ras Koh Hills in Chagai District of Balochistan Province. The announced yield of the five devices was a total of 40–45 kilotonnes with the largest having a yield of approximately 30–45 kilotonnes. An independent assessment however put the test yield at no more than 12 kt and the maximum yield of a single device at only 9 kt as opposed to 35 kt as claimed by Pakistani authorities. According to The Bulletin of the Atomic Scientists, the maximum yield was only 2–10 kt as opposed to the claim of 35 kt and the total yield of all tests was no more than 8–15 kt.
- May 30, 1998: Chagai-II (type: implosion, plutonium device and underground). One underground vertical-shaft tunnel test of a miniaturized fission device having an announced yield of approximately 18–20 kilotonnes, carried out in the Kharan Desert in Kharan District, Balochistan Province. An independent assessment put the figure of this test at 4–6 kt only. Some Western seismologists put the figure at a mere 2 kt.

=== North Korea ===
On October 9, 2006, North Korea announced they had conducted a nuclear test in North Hamgyong Province on the northeast coast at 10:36 AM (11:30 AEST). There was a 3.58 magnitude earthquake reported in South Korea, and a 4.2 magnitude tremor was detected 386 km (240 mi) north of P'yongyang. The low estimates on the yield of the test—potentially less than a kiloton in strength—have led to speculation as to whether it was a fizzle (unsuccessful test), or not a genuine nuclear test at all.

On May 25, 2009, North Korea announced having conducted a second nuclear test. A tremor, with magnitude reports ranging from 4.7 to 5.3, was detected at Mantapsan, 375 km (233 mi) northeast of P'yongyang and within a few kilometers of the 2006 test location. While estimates, as to yield, are still uncertain, with reports ranging from 3 to 20 kilotons, the stronger tremor indicates a significantly larger yield than the 2006 test.

On 12 February 2013, North Korean state media announced it had conducted an underground nuclear test, its third in seven years. A tremor that exhibited a nuclear bomb signature with an initial magnitude 4.9 (later revised to 5.1) was detected by both Comprehensive Nuclear-Test-Ban Treaty Organization Preparatory Commission (CTBTO) and the United States Geological Survey (USGS). The tremor occurred at 11:57 local time (02:57 UTC) and the USGS said the hypocenter of the event was only one kilometer deep. South Korea's defense ministry said the event reading indicated a blast of six to seven kilotons. However, there are some experts who estimate the yield to be up to 15 kt, since the test site's geology is not well understood. In comparison, the atomic (fission) bombs dropped by the Enola Gay on Hiroshima (Little Boy, a gun-type atomic bomb) and on Nagasaki by Bockscar (Fat Man, an implosion-type atomic bomb) had blast yields of the equivalents of 15 and 21 kilotons of TNT, respectively.

On January 6, 2016, North Korea announced that it conducted a successful test of a hydrogen bomb. The seismic event, at a magnitude of 5.1, occurred 19 kilometers (12 miles) east-northeast of Sungjibaegam.

On September 9, 2016, North Korea announced another successful nuclear weapon test at the Punggye-ri Test Site. This is the first warhead the state claims to be able to mount to a missile or long-range rocket previously tested in June 2016. Estimates for the explosive yield range from 20 to 30 kt and coincided with a 5.3 magnitude earthquake in the region.

On September 3, 2017, North Korea successfully detonated its first weapon self-designated as a hydrogen bomb. Initial yield estimates place it at 100 kt. Reports indicate that the test blast caused a magnitude 6.3 earthquake, and possibly resulted in a cave-in at the test site.

== Alleged tests ==
There have been a number of significant alleged, disputed or unacknowledged accounts of countries testing nuclear explosives. Their status is either not certain or entirely disputed by most mainstream experts.

=== China ===
On April 15, 2020, the Wall Street Journal published details of a US State Department report on activity during 2019 at China's Lop Nur test site, alleging supercritical experiments could have occurred in an absence of effective monitoring.

China’s possible preparation to operate its Lop Nur test site year-round, its use of explosive containment chambers, extensive excavation activities at Lop Nur, and lack of transparency on its nuclear testing activities – which has included frequently blocking the flow of data from its International Monitoring System (IMS) stations to the International Data Center operated by the Preparatory Commission for the Comprehensive Nuclear Test-Ban Treaty Organization – raise concerns regarding its adherence to the “zero yield” standard.

— U.S. Department of State, Executive Summary on Findings On Adherence to and Compliance with Arms Control, Nonproliferation, and Disarmament Agreements and Commitments, April 2020

On February 6, 2026, the Under Secretary of State for Arms Control and International Security, Thomas DiNanno, stated that the US government was aware that China had conducted covert underground tests and that one such test had occurred on June 22, 2020 with a nuclear yield in the "hundreds of tons". These tests were alleged to have been hidden using decoupling, which involves carrying out nuclear explosions in large underground cavities to lessen their seismic activity.

=== Israel ===
Israel was alleged by a Bundeswehr report to have made an underground test in 1963. Historian Taysir Nashif reported a zero yield implosion test in 1966. Scientists from Israel participated in the earliest French nuclear tests before DeGaulle cut off further cooperation.

=== North Korea ===
On September 9, 2004, South Korean media reported that there had been a large explosion at the Chinese/North Korean border. This explosion left a crater visible by satellite and precipitated a large (3-km diameter) mushroom cloud. The United States and South Korea quickly downplayed this, explaining it as a forest fire that had nothing to do with the DPRK's nuclear weapons program.

=== Pakistan ===
Development of nuclear weapons in Pakistan was conducted under extreme secrecy, it raised concerns in the Soviet Union and India who suspected that since the 1974 nuclear test by India, it was inevitable that Pakistan would further develop its program. The pro-Soviet newspaper, The Patriot, reported that "Pakistan has exploded a nuclear device in the range of 20 to 50 kilotons" in 1983. But it was widely dismissed by European diplomats as it was pointed out that The Patriot had previously engaged in spreading disinformation on several occasions. In 1983, India and the Soviet Union both investigated secret tests but, due to lack of any scientific data, these statements were widely dismissed.

In their book, The Nuclear Express, authors Thomas Reed and Danny Stillman also allege that the People's Republic of China allowed Pakistan to detonate a nuclear weapon at its Lop Nur test site in 1990, eight years before Pakistan held its first official weapons test.

However, senior scientist Abdul Qadeer Khan strongly rejected the claim in May 1998. According to Khan, due to its sensitivity, no country allows another country to use their test site to explode the devices. Such an agreement only existed between the United States and the United Kingdom since the 1958 US–UK Mutual Defense Agreement which among other things allows Britain access to the American Nevada National Security Site for testing. Dr. Samar Mubarakmand, another senior scientist, also confirmed Dr. Khan's statement and acknowledged that cold tests were carried out, under codename Kirana-I, in a test site which was built by the Corps of Engineers under the guidance of the PAEC. Additionally, the UK conducted nuclear tests in Australia in the 1950s.

=== Russia ===
The Yekaterinburg Fireball of November 14, 2014, is alleged by some to have been a nuclear test in space, which would not have been detected by the CTBTO because the CTBTO does not have autonomous ways to monitor space nuclear tests (i.e. satellites) and relies thus on information that member States would accept to provide. The fireball happened a few days before a conference in Yekaterinburg on the theme of air/missile defense. The affirmation, however, is disputed as the Russian Ministry of Emergency Situations claimed it was an "on-ground" explosion. The Siberian Times, a local newspaper, noted that "the light was not accompanied by any sound".

=== Vela incident ===
The Vela incident was an unidentified double flash of light detected by a partly functional, decommissioned American Vela Satellite on September 22, 1979, in the Indian Ocean (near the Prince Edward Islands off Antarctica). Sensors which could have recorded proof of a nuclear test were not functioning on this satellite. It is possible that this was produced by a nuclear device. If this flash detection was actually a nuclear test, a popular theory favored in the diary of then sitting American President Jimmy Carter, is that it resulted from a covert joint South African and Israeli nuclear test of an advanced highly miniaturized Israeli artillery shell sized device which was unintentionally detectable by satellite optical sensor due to a break in the cloud cover of a typhoon. Analysis of the South African nuclear program later showed only six of the crudest and heavy designs weighing well over 340 kg had been built when they finally declared and disarmed their nuclear arsenal. The 1986 Vanunu leaks analyzed by nuclear weapon miniaturization pioneer Ted Taylor revealed very sophisticated miniaturized Israeli designs among the evidence presented. Also suspected were France testing a neutron bomb near their Kerguelen Islands territory, the Soviet Union making a prohibited atmospheric test, as well as India or Pakistan doing initial proof of concept tests of early weaponized nuclear bombs.

== Tests of live warheads on rockets ==
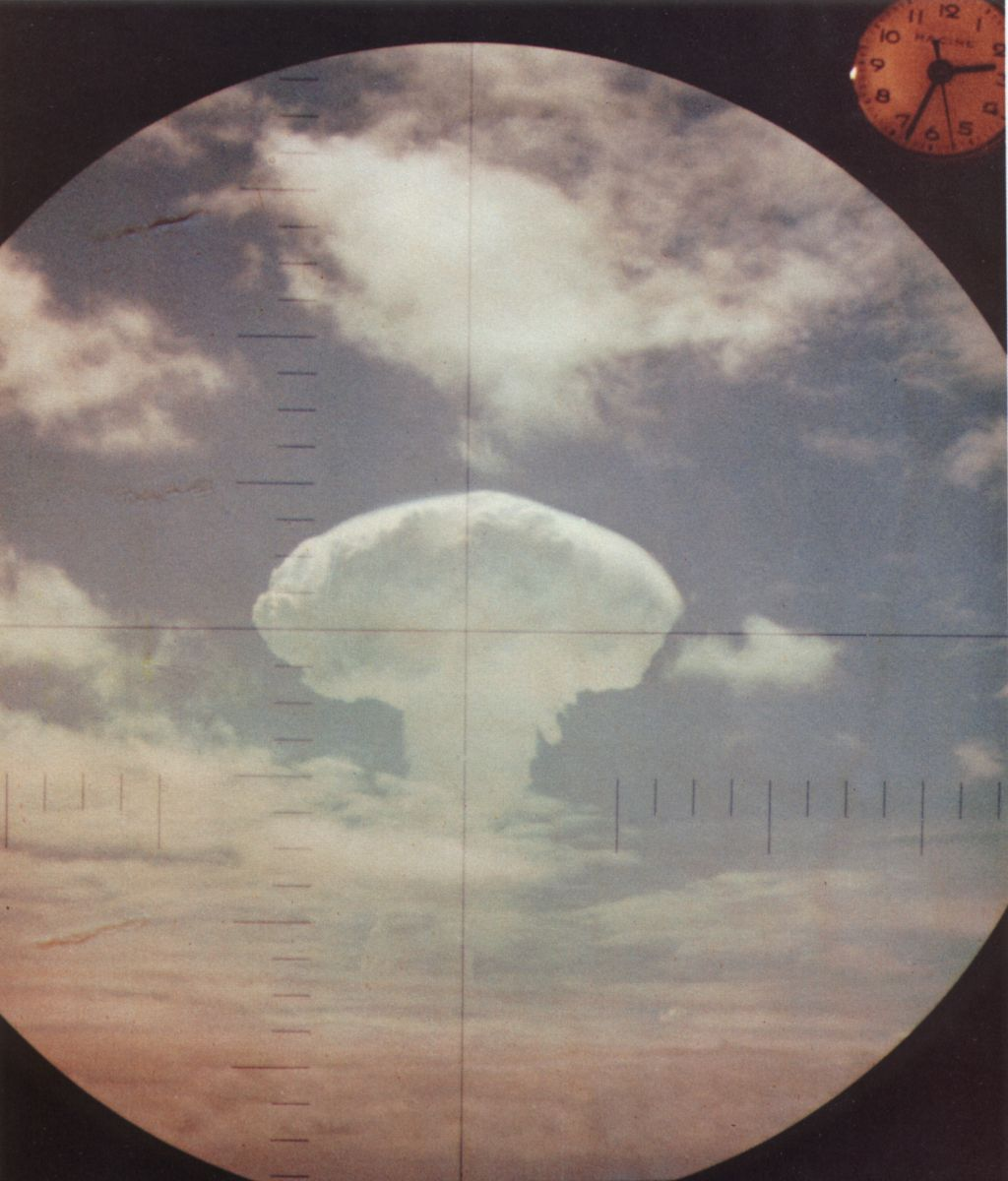
The Frigate Bird explosion seen through the periscope of USS Carbonero (SS-337).

Missiles and nuclear warheads have usually been tested separately because testing them together is considered highly dangerous; they are certainly the most extreme type of live fire exercise. The only US live test of an operational missile was the following:

- Frigate Bird: on May 6, 1962, a UGM-27 Polaris A-2 missile with a live 600 kt W47 warhead was launched from the USS Ethan Allen; it flew 1,800 km (1,100 mi), re-entered the atmosphere, and detonated at an altitude of 3.4 km (2.1 mi) over the South Pacific.

Other live tests with the nuclear explosive delivered by rocket by the USA include:

- The July 19, 1957 test Plumbbob/John fired a small yield nuclear weapon on an AIR-2 Genie air-to-air rocket from a jet fighter.
- On August 1, 1958, Redstone rocket launched nuclear test Teak that detonated at an altitude of 77.8 km (48.3 mi). On August 12, 1958, Redstone #CC51 launched nuclear test Orange to a detonation altitude of 43 km (27 mi). Both were part of Operation Hardtack I and had a yield of 3.75 Mt
- Operation Argus: three tests above the South Atlantic Ocean, August 27, August 30, and September 6, 1958
- On July 9, 1962, Thor missile launched a Mk4 reentry vehicle containing a W49 thermonuclear warhead to an altitude of 248 miles (400 km). The warhead detonated with a yield of 1.45 Mt. This was the Starfish Prime event of nuclear test operation Dominic-Fishbowl
- In the Dominic-Fishbowl series in 1962: Checkmate, Bluegill, Kingfish and Tightrope

The United States also conducted two live weapons test involving nuclear artillery including:

- Test of the M65 atomic cannon using the W9 artillery shell during the Upshot-Knothole Grable test on May 25, 1953.
- Test of the Davy Crockett recoilless gun during Little Feller I test on July 17, 1962.

The United States also conducted one live weapons test involving a missile launched nuclear depth charge:

- Test of the RUR-5 ASROC during the Dominic-Swordfish test on May 11, 1962.

The Soviet Union tested nuclear explosives on rockets as part of their development of a localized anti-ballistic missile system in the 1960s. Some of the Soviet nuclear tests with warheads delivered by rocket include:

- Baikal (USSR Test #25, February 2, 1956, at Aralsk) – one test, with a R-5M rocket launch from Kapustin Yar.
- ZUR-215 (#34, January 19, 1957, at Kapustin Yar) – one test, with a rocket launch from Kapustin Yar.
- (#82 and 83, early November 1958) two tests, done after declared cease-fire for test moratorium negotiations, from Kapustin Yar.
- Groza (#88, September 6, 1961, at Kapustin Yar) – one test, with a rocket launch from Kapustin Yar.
- Grom (#115, October 6, 1961, at Kapustin Yar) – one test, with a rocket launch from Kapustin Yar.
- Volga (#106 and 108, September 20–22, 1961, at Novaya Zemlya) – two tests, with R-11M rockets launch from Rogachevo.
- Roza (#94 and 99, September 12–16, 1961, at Novaya Zemlya) – two tests, with R-12 rockets launch from Vorkuta.
- Raduga (#121, October 20, 1961, at Novaya Zemlya) – one test, with a R-13 rocket launch.
- Tyulpan (#164, September 8, 1962, at Novaya Zemlya) – one test, with R-14 rockets launched from Chita.
- Operation K (1961 and 1962, at Sary-Shagan) – five tests, at high altitude, with rockets launched from Kapustin Yar.

The Soviet Union also conducted three live nuclear torpedo tests including:

- Test of the T-5 torpedo on September 21, 1955 at Novaya Zemlya.
- Test of the T-5 torpedo on October 10, 1957 at Novaya Zemlya.
- Test of the T-5 torpedo on October 23, 1961 at Novaya Zemlya.

The People's Republic of China conducted CHIC-4 with a Dongfeng-2 rocket launch on October 25, 1966. The warhead exploded with a yield of 12 kt.

== Most powerful tests ==
The following is a list of the most powerful nuclear weapon tests. All tests on the first chart were multi-stage thermonuclear weapons.

Worldwide nuclear test with a yield of 1.4 Mt TNT equivalent and more
Date (GMT)	Yield (megatons)	Deployment	Country	Test site	Name or number
October 30, 1961	50	parachute air drop	USSR	Novaya Zemlya	Tsar Bomba, Test #130
December 24, 1962	24.2	missile warhead	USSR	Novaya Zemlya	Test #219
August 5, 1962	21.1	air drop	USSR	Novaya Zemlya	Test #147
September 27, 1962	20.0	air drop	USSR	Novaya Zemlya	Test #174
September 25, 1962	19.1	air drop	USSR	Novaya Zemlya	Test #173
March 1, 1954	15	ground	USA	Bikini Atoll	Castle Bravo
May 5, 1954	13.5	barge	USA	Bikini Atoll	Castle Yankee
October 23, 1961	12.5	air drop	USSR	Novaya Zemlya	Test #123
March 26, 1954	11.0	barge	USA	Bikini Atoll	Castle Romeo
October 31, 1952	10.4	ground	USA	Enewetak Atoll	Ivy Mike
August 25, 1962	10.0	air drop	USSR	Novaya Zemlya	Test #158
September 19, 1962	10.0	air drop	USSR	Novaya Zemlya	Test #168
October 30, 1962	9.96	air drop	USA	Johnston Atoll	Housatonic
July 11, 1958	9.3	barge	USA	Bikini Atoll	Poplar
June 28, 1958	8.9	barge	USA	Enewetak Atoll	Oak
October 22, 1962	8.2	air drop	USSR	Novaya Zemlya	Test #183
June 27, 1962	7.7	air drop	USA	Kiritimati	Bighorn
April 25, 1954	6.9	barge	USA	Bikini Atoll	Castle Union
July 20, 1956	5.0	barge	USA	Bikini Atoll	Tewa
October 31, 1961	5.0	air drop	USSR	Novaya Zemlya	Test #131
November 6, 1971	4.8	underground shaft	USA	Amchitka	Cannikin
July 10, 1956	4.5	barge	USA	Bikini Atoll	Navajo
August 27, 1962	4.2	air drop	USSR	Novaya Zemlya	Test #160
October 6, 1961	4.0	air drop	USSR	Novaya Zemlya	Test #114
October 27, 1973	4.0	underground shaft	USSR	Novaya Zemlya	Test #392
November 17, 1976	4.0	air drop	China	Lop Nur	Test (21)
July 11, 1962	3.9	parachuted	USA	Kiritimati	Pamlico
May 20, 1956	3.8	free air drop	USA	Bikini Atoll	Cherokee
August 1, 1958	3.8	high alt rocket	USA	Johnston Atoll	Teak
August 12, 1958	3.8	high alt rocket	USA	Johnston Atoll	Orange
September 12, 1973	3.8	tunnel	USSR	Novaya Zemlya	Test #385 - 1
May 27, 1956	3.5	dry surface	USA	Bikini Atoll	Zuni
October 14, 1970	3.4	air drop	China	Lop Nur	CHIC-11
September 16, 1962	3.3	air drop	USSR	Novaya Zemlya	Test #166
June 17, 1967	3.3	parachuted	China	Lop Nur	CHIC-6
September 15, 1962	3.1	air drop	USSR	Novaya Zemlya	Test #165
December 25, 1962	3.1	air drop	USSR	Novaya Zemlya	Test #220
April 28, 1958	3.0	air drop	UK	Kiritimati	Grapple Y
October 4, 1961	3.0	air drop	USSR	Novaya Zemlya	Test #113
June 10, 1962	3.0	free air drop	USA	Kiritimati	Yeso
December 27, 1968	3.0	air drop	China	Lop Nur	CHIC-8
September 29, 1969	3.0	air drop	China	Lop Nur	CHIC-10
June 27, 1973	3.0	air drop	China	Lop Nur	Test (15)
October 6, 1957	2.9	air drop	USSR	Novaya Zemlya	Test #47
October 18, 1958	2.9	air drop	USSR	Novaya Zemlya	Test #73
October 22, 1958	2.8	air drop	USSR	Novaya Zemlya	Test #78
August 20, 1962	2.8	air drop	USSR	Novaya Zemlya	Test #152
September 10, 1961	2.7	air drop	USSR	Novaya Zemlya	90 Vozduj
August 24, 1968	2.6	balloon	France	Fangataufa	Canopus
September 27, 1971	2.5	tunnel	USSR	Novaya Zemlya	Test #345 - 1
September 21, 1962	2.4	air drop	USSR	Novaya Zemlya	Test #169
November 2, 1974	2.3	underground shaft	USSR	Novaya Zemlya	Test #411
October 14, 1970	2.2	tunnel	USSR	Novaya Zemlya	Test #327 - 1
July 26, 1958	2.0	barge	USA	Enewetak Atoll	Pine
July 8, 1956	1.9	barge	USA	Enewetak Atoll	Apache
September 8, 1962	1.9	high alt rocket	USSR	Novaya Zemlya	164 Tyulpan
March 26, 1970	1.9	underground shaft	USA	Nevada	Handley
November 8, 1957	1.8	air drop	UK	Kiritimati	Grapple X
May 13, 1954	1.7	barge	USA	Enewetak Atoll	Nectar
November 22, 1955	1.6	air drop	USSR	Semipalatinsk	24 Binarnaya
September 24, 1957	1.6	air drop	USSR	Novaya Zemlya	Test #45
August 22, 1962	1.6	air drop	USSR	Novaya Zemlya	Test #154
October 18, 1962	1.6	parachuted	USA	Johnston Atoll	Chama
February 27, 1958	1.5	air drop	USSR	Novaya Zemlya	Test #54
June 14, 1958	1.5	barge	USA	Enewetak Atoll	Walnut
October 12, 1958	1.5	air drop	USSR	Novaya Zemlya	Test #71
October 15, 1958	1.5	air drop	USSR	Novaya Zemlya	Test #72
September 20, 1961	1.5	high alt rocket	USSR	Novaya Zemlya	106 Volga1
October 20, 1961	1.5	high alt rocket	USSR	Novaya Zemlya	121 Raduga
November 4, 1961	1.5	air drop	USSR	Novaya Zemlya	Test #140
May 11, 1958	1.4	barge	USA	Bikini Atoll	Fir
May 12, 1958	1.4	dry surface	USA	Enewetak Atoll	Koa
July 9, 1962	1.4	space rocket	USA	Johnston Atoll	Starfish Prime
September 18, 1962	1.4	air drop	USSR	Novaya Zemlya	Test #167
April 26, 1968	1.3	underground shaft	USA	Nevada Test Site	Boxcar
October 21, 1975	1.3	tunnel	USSR	Novaya Zemlya	Test #432-1
September 8, 1968	1.3	balloon	France	Moruroa	Procyon
June 30, 1962	1.27	parachuted	USA	Kiritimati	Bluestone
June 12, 1962	1.2	parachuted	USA	Kiritimati	Harlem
September 12, 1961	1.2	space rocket	USSR	Novaya Zemlya	Test #94 Roza1
September 14, 1961	1.2	space rocket	USSR	Novaya Zemlya	Test #98
August 29, 1974	1.2	tunnel	USSR	Novaya Zemlya	Test #407-1
December 19. 1968	1.2	underground shaft	USA	Nevada Test Site	Benham
June 25, 1956	1.1	barge	USA	Bikini	Dakota
May 2, 1962	1.1	parachuted	USA	Kiritimati	Arkansas
December 24, 1962	1.1	air drop	USSR	Novaya Zemlya	Test #218
August 28, 1972	1.1	tunnel	USSR	Novaya Zemlya	Test #368-1
August 23, 1975	1.1	tunnel	USSR	Novaya Zemlya	Test #427-1
July 10, 1962	1.0	air drop	USA	Kiritimati	Sunset
January 19, 1968	1.0	underground shaft	USA	Nevada	Faultless
October 2, 1969	1.0	underground shaft	USA	Alaska	Milrow
October 28, 1975	1.0	underground shaft	USA	Nevada Test Site	Kasseri
October 24, 1958	1.0	air drop	USSR	Novaya Zemlya	Test #79

Largest fission bomb tests
Date (GMT)	Yield (kilotons)	Deployment	Country	Test Site	Name or Number
May 31, 1957	720	air drop	UK	Malden Island	Orange Herald (boosted)
November 16, 1952	540	air drop	USA	Runit Island	Ivy King (pure fission)
July 15, 1968	450	air drop	France	Moruroa Atoll	Castor (boosted)
July 12, 1971	440	air drop	France	Moruroa Atoll	Encelade (boosted)
August 12, 1953	400	tower shot	USSR	Semipalatinsk, Kazakhstan	Joe 4 (boosted)
August 12, 1953	250	tower shot	USSR	Semipalatinsk, Kazakhstan	Joe 18 (boosted)
May 8, 1951	225	air drop	USA	Enewetak Atoll	Operation Greenhouse George (boosted)
October 4, 1966	205	air drop	France	Moruroa Atoll	Sirius (unknown)

== See also ==
- Andrei Sakharov
- Edward Teller
- High explosive nuclear effects testing
- Historical nuclear weapons stockpiles and nuclear tests by country
- International Day against Nuclear Tests
- J. Robert Oppenheimer
- Largest artificial non-nuclear explosions
- List of nuclear weapon test locations
- List of nuclear weapons tests of China
- Lists of nuclear disasters and radioactive incidents
- Novaya Zemlya
- Nuclear fallout
- Nuclear Test Ban
- Soviet atomic bomb project
- Stanislaw Ulam
