= Timeline of strategic nuclear weapon systems of the United Kingdom =

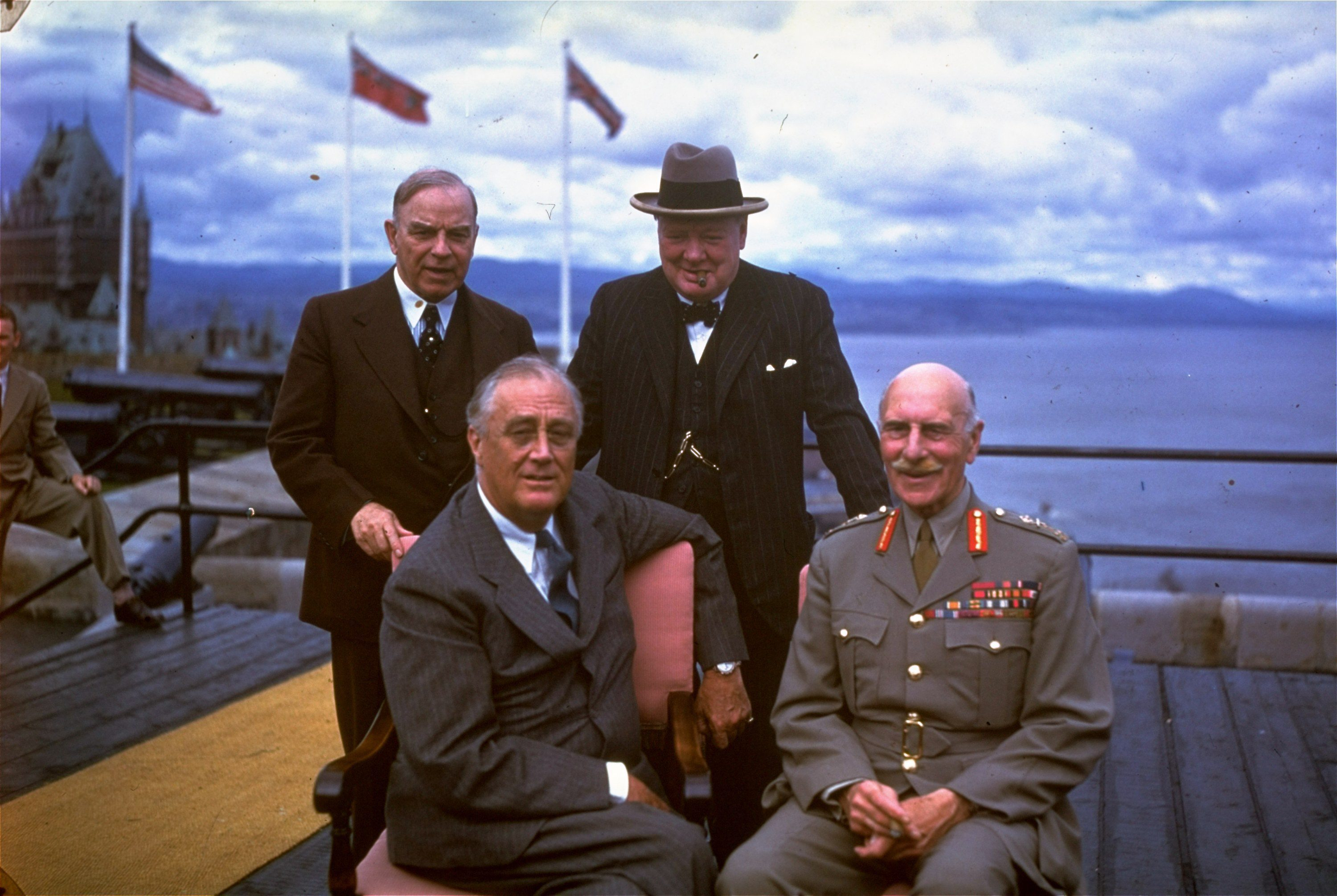
Political leaders gather for a portrait atop the Citadel of Quebec during the second Quebec Conference in 1943. Clockwise, from top-left are: Canadian Prime Minister Mackenzie King; British Prime Minister Winston Churchill; the Earl of Athlone, Governor General of Canada; and US President Franklin D. Roosevelt.

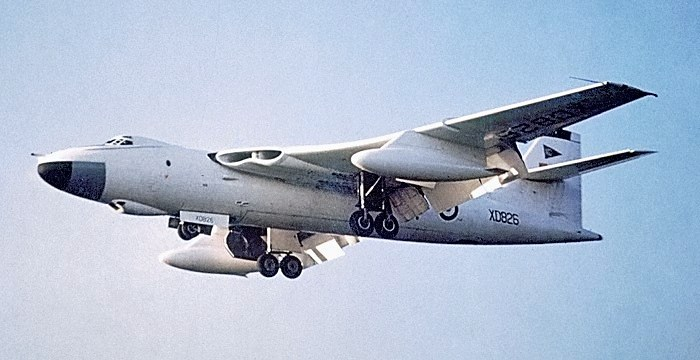
Vickers Valiant bomber

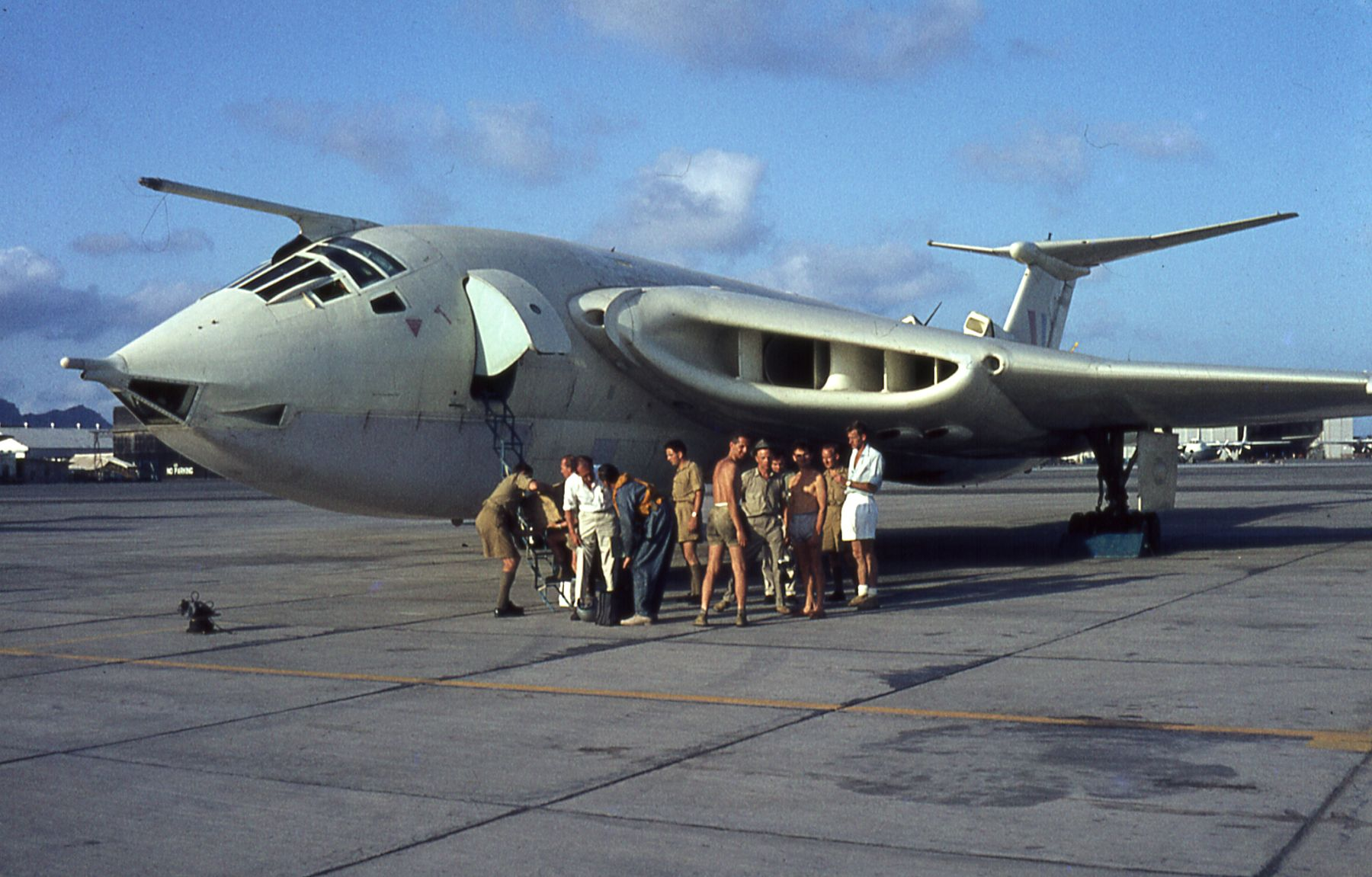
Handley Page Victor bomber

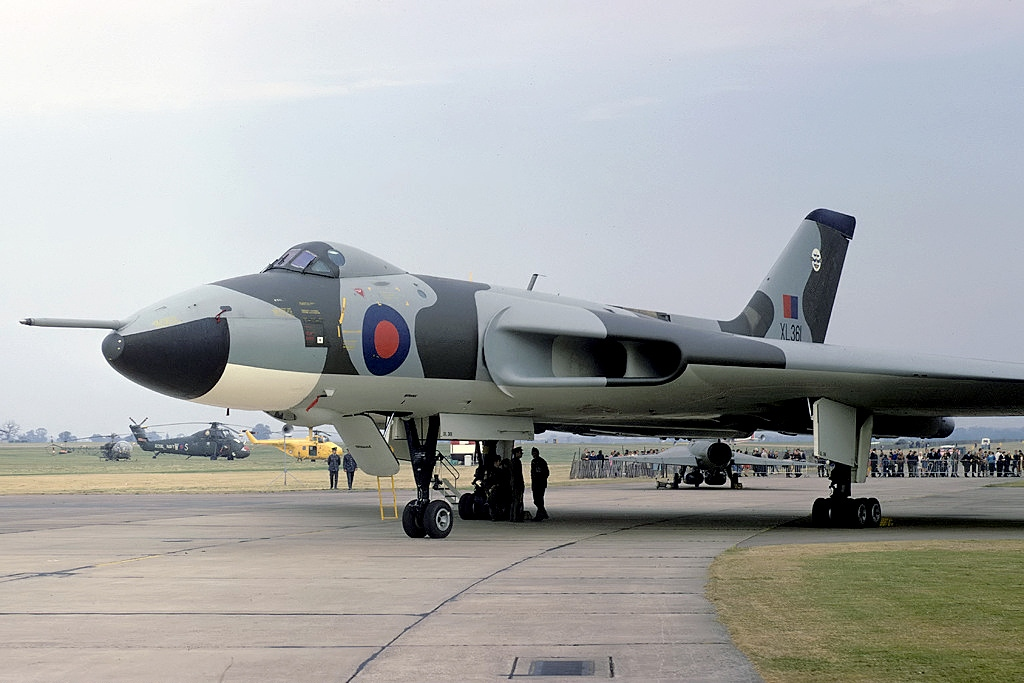
Avro Vulcan bomber

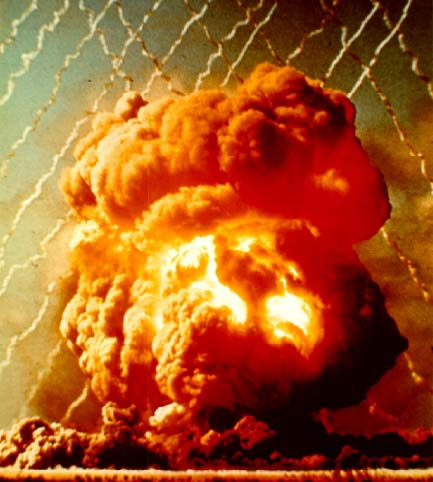
Operation Buffalo nuclear test at Maralinga

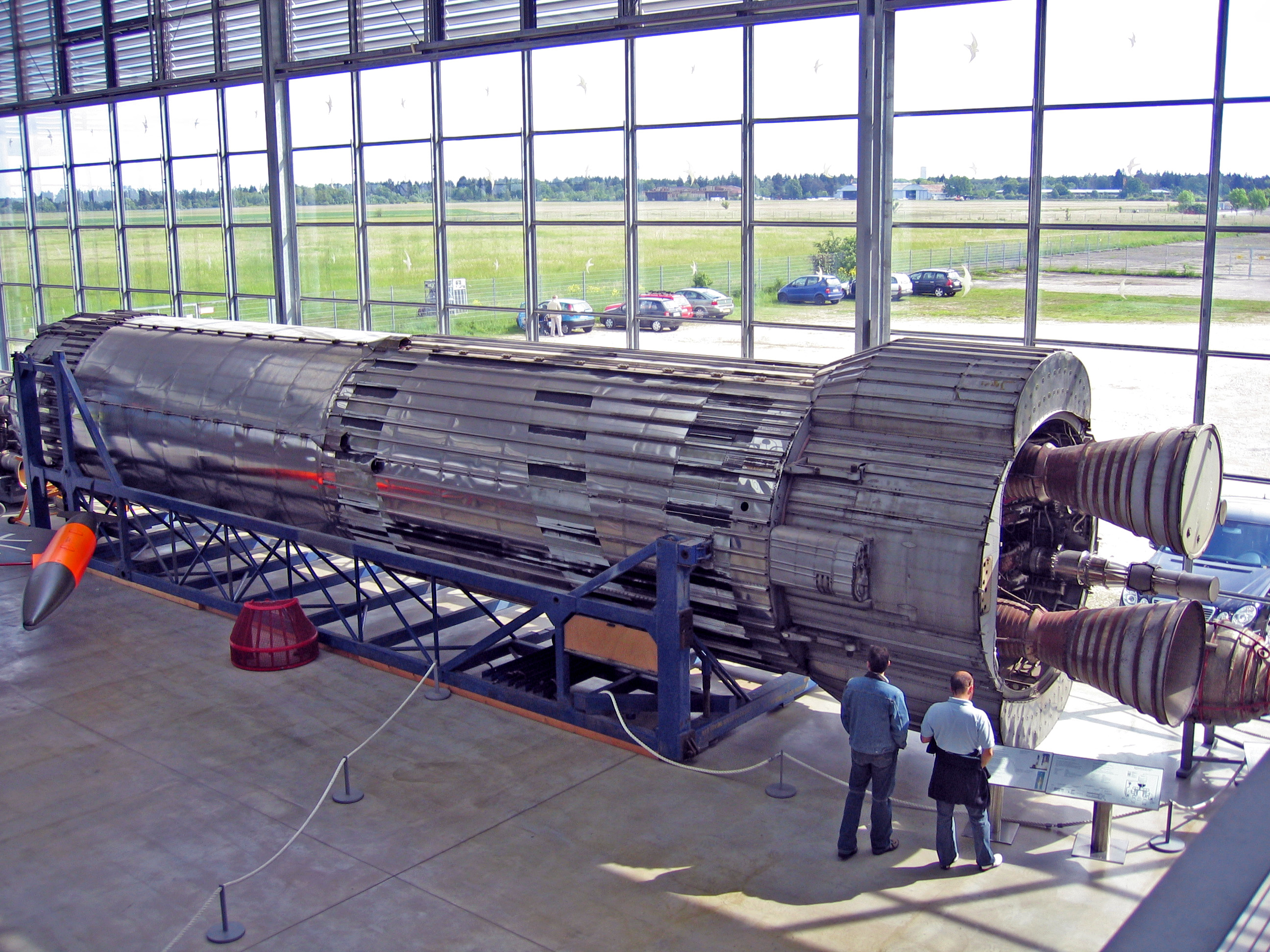
Blue Streak

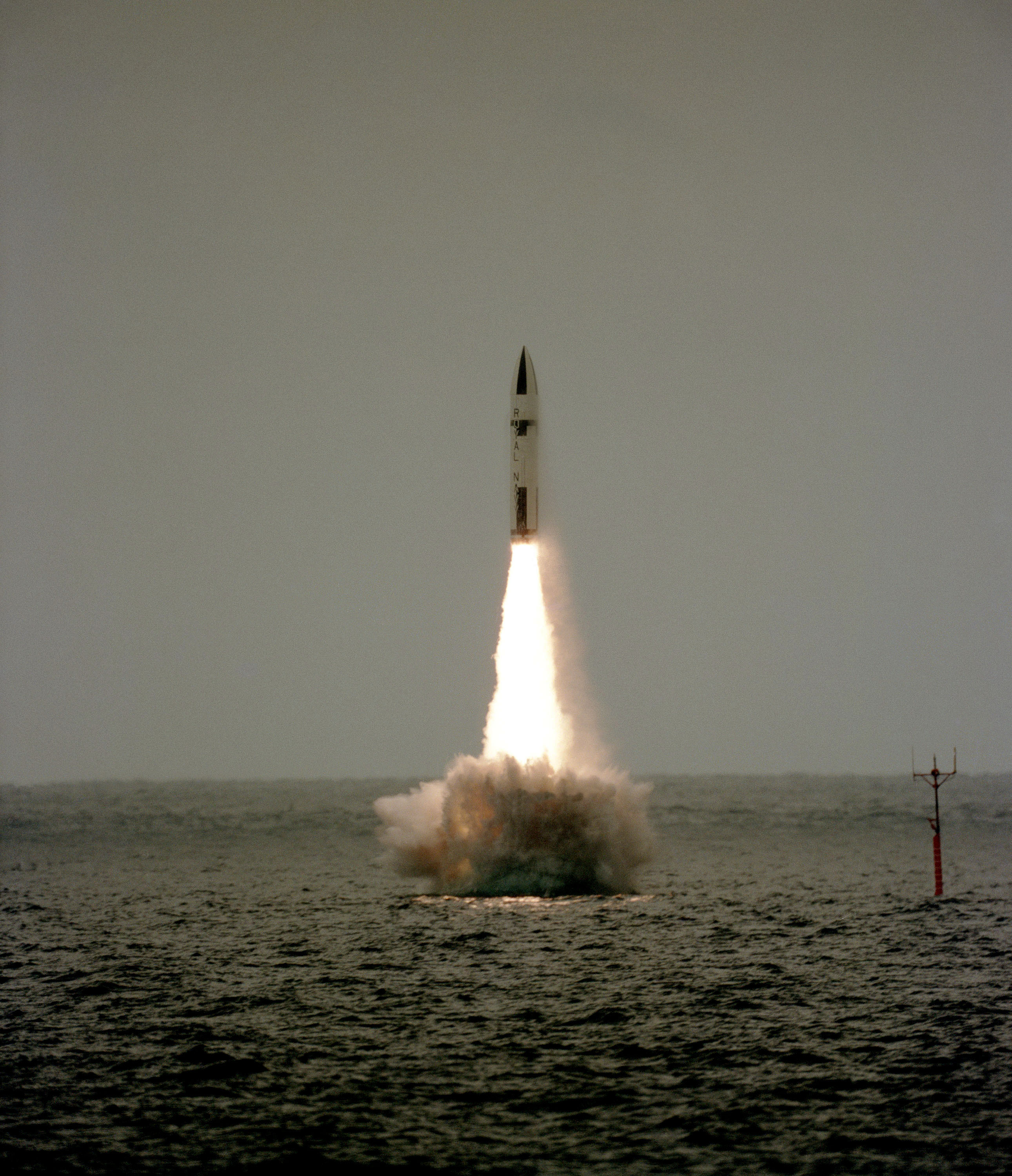
A Polaris missile is fired by HMS Revenge

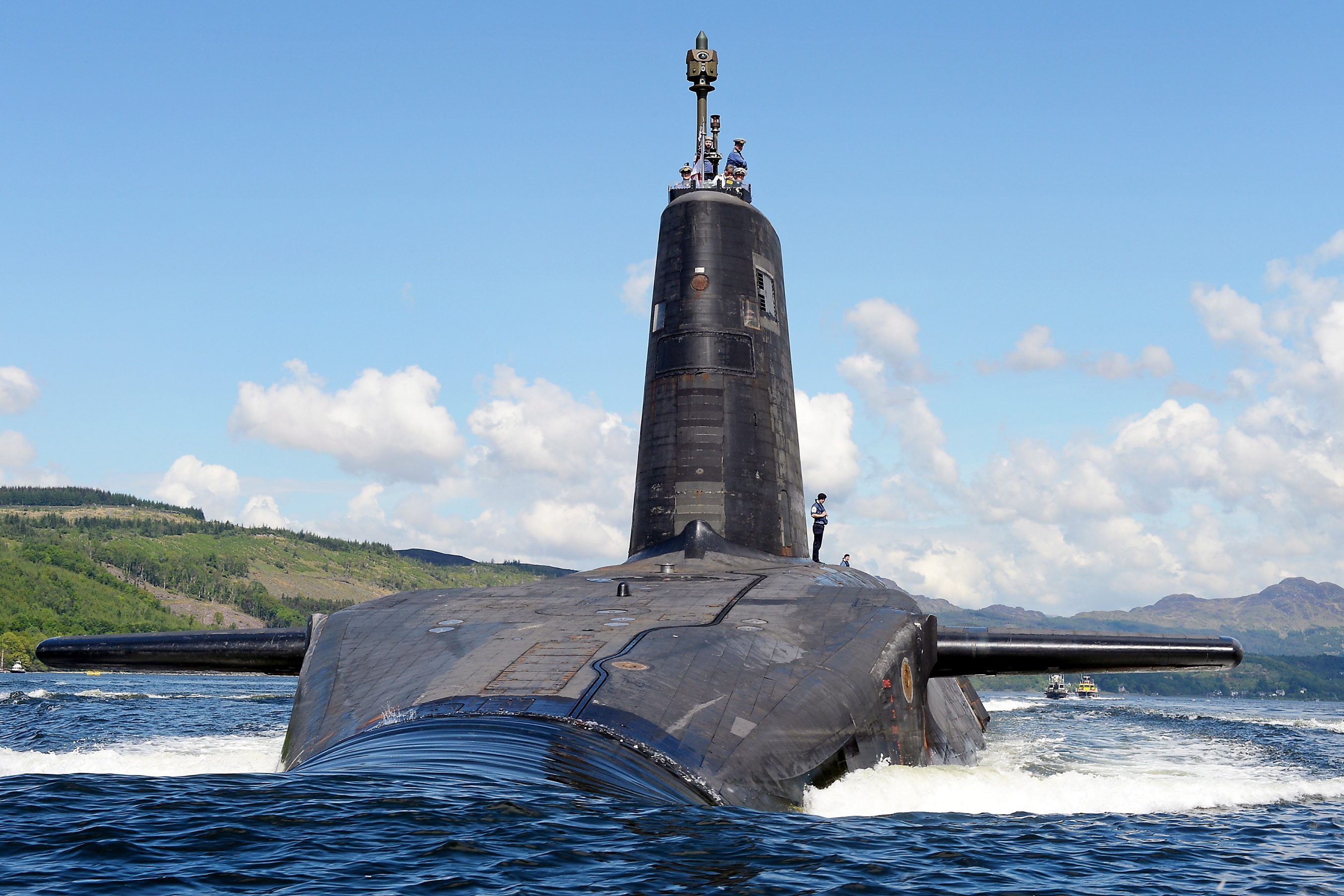
The Trident nuclear submarine HMS Victorious departs HMNB Clyde

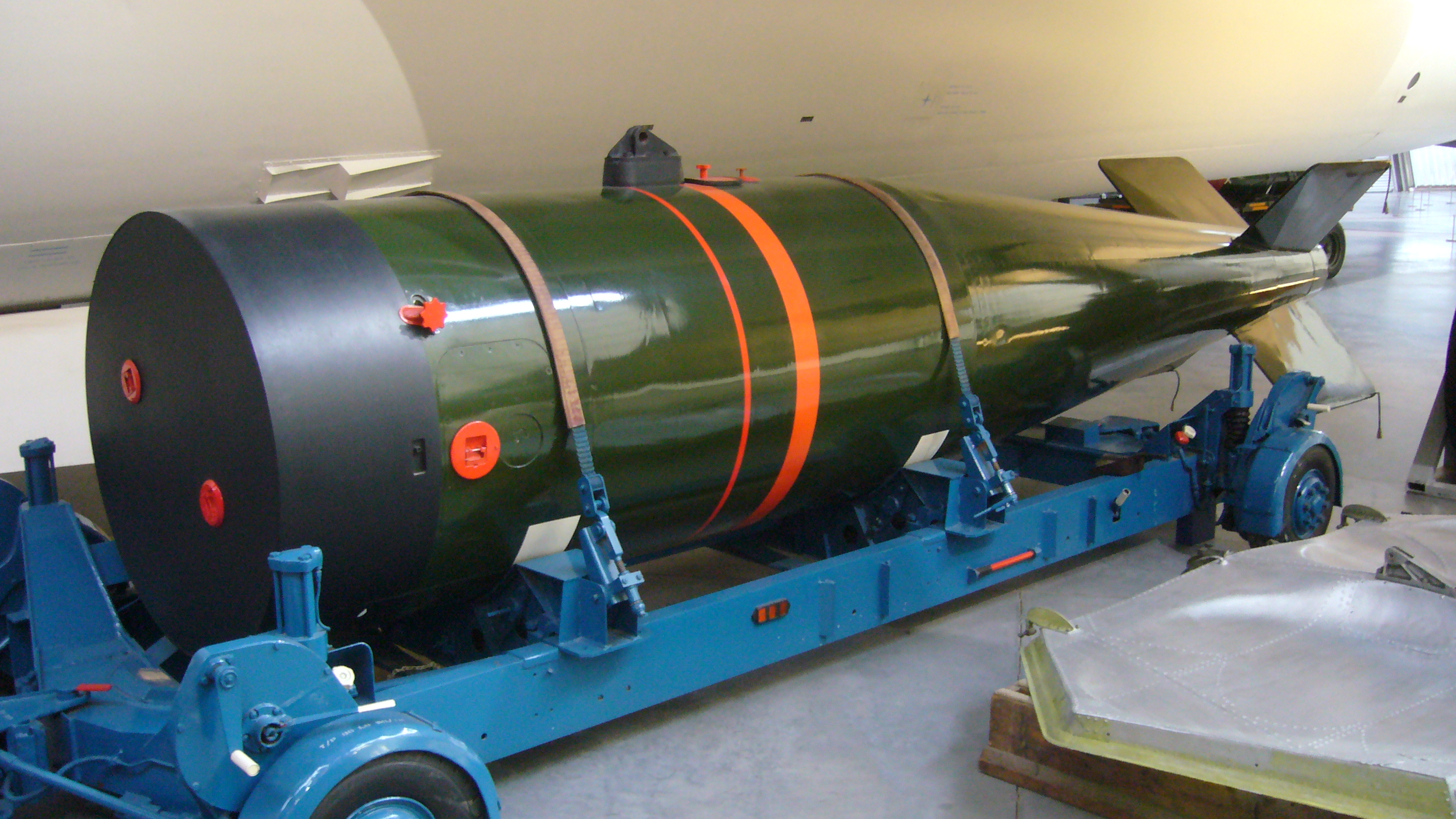
Yellow Sun, Britain's first production thermonuclear bomb

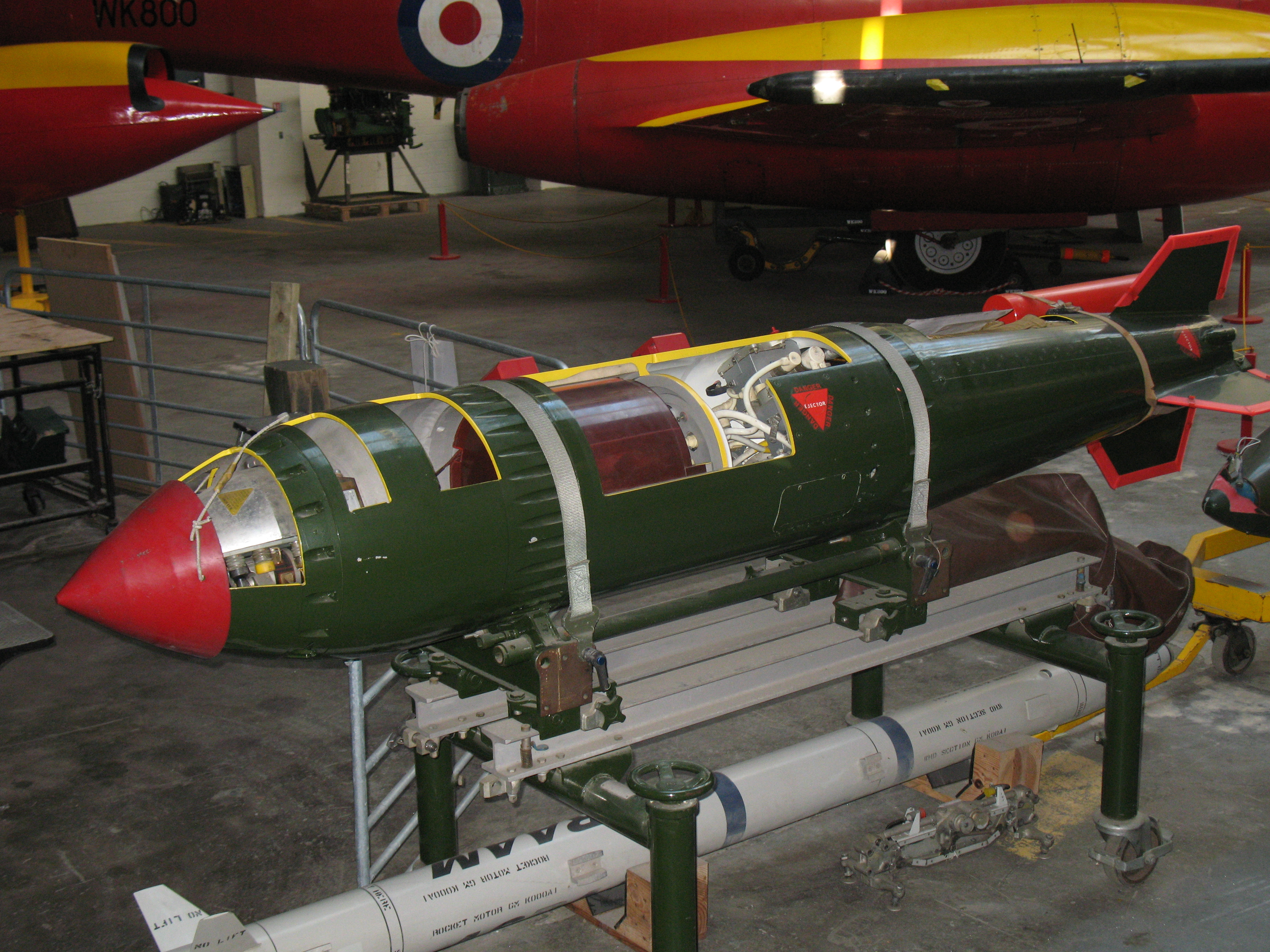
WE.177A sectioned instructional example of an operational round

In 1952, the United Kingdom was the third country to develop and test nuclear weapons, after the United States and Soviet Union. and is one of the five nuclear-weapon states under the Treaty on the Non-Proliferation of Nuclear Weapons.

The UK initiated a nuclear weapons programme, codenamed Tube Alloys, during the Second World War. At the Quebec Conference in August 1943, it was merged with the American Manhattan Project. The British contribution to the Manhattan Project saw British scientists participate in most of its work. The British government considered nuclear weapons to be a joint discovery, but the American Atomic Energy Act of 1946 (McMahon Act) restricted other countries, including the UK, from access to information about nuclear weapons. Fearing the loss of Britain's great power status, the UK resumed its own project, now codenamed High Explosive Research. On 3 October 1952, it detonated an atomic bomb in the Monte Bello Islands in Australia in Operation Hurricane. Eleven more British nuclear weapons tests in Australia were carried out over the following decade, including seven British nuclear tests at Maralinga in 1956 and 1957.

The British hydrogen bomb programme demonstrated Britain's ability to produce thermonuclear weapons in the Operation Grapple nuclear tests in the Pacific, and led to the amendment of the McMahon Act. Since the 1958 US–UK Mutual Defence Agreement, the US and the UK have cooperated extensively on nuclear security matters. The nuclear Special Relationship between the two countries has involved the exchange of classified scientific data and fissile materials such as uranium-235 and plutonium. After the cancellation of the Blue Streak in 1960, the US supplied the UK with Polaris missiles and nuclear submarine technology. The US also supplied the Royal Air Force and British Army of the Rhine with nuclear weapons under Project E in the form of aerial bombs, missiles, depth charges and artillery shells until 1992. Nuclear-capable American aircraft have been based in the UK since 1949, but the last US nuclear weapons were withdrawn in 2006. In 1982, the Polaris Sales Agreement was amended to allow the UK to purchase Trident II missiles. Since 1998, when the UK decommissioned its tactical WE.177 bombs, the Trident has been the only operational nuclear weapons system in British service.

== 1913 ==
H. G. Wells coins the term "atomic bomb" in his novel The World Set Free.

== 1932 ==
- February: The neutron discovered by James Chadwick at the Cavendish Laboratory at the University of Cambridge.
- April: John Cockcroft and Ernest Walton split lithium nuclei with accelerated protons at the Cavendish Laboratory.

== 1933 ==
- Ernest Rutherford and Mark Oliphant discover helium-3 and tritium.

== 1938 ==
- December: In Germany, Otto Hahn and Fritz Strassmann bombard uranium with neutrons, and discover that the uranium had been split.

== 1939 ==
- January: Lise Meitner and Otto Frisch publish a theoretical justification for the process in Nature, which they call "fission".
- January: Niels Bohr and John A. Wheeler apply the liquid drop model developed by Bohr and Fritz Kalckar to explain the mechanism of nuclear fission. Bohr hypothesises that uranium-235 is largely responsible.
- 3 September: Great Britain and France declare war on Nazi Germany in response to its invasion of Poland, beginning World War II in Europe.

== 1940 ==
- March: The Frisch–Peierls memorandum estimates that a few kilograms of pure uranium-235 would explode with the energy of thousands of tons of dynamite.
- April: MAUD Committee is set up to investigate.

== 1941 ==
- July: MAUD Committee issues its report. Endorses conclusion that a practical atomic bomb is possible.
- November: Tube Alloys directorate created to coordinate the effort to develop an atomic bomb. Sir John Anderson, the Lord President of the Council, becomes the minister responsible, and Wallace Akers from Imperial Chemical Industries (ICI) is appointed its director.

== 1943 ==
- August 1943: Quebec Agreement merges Tube Alloys with the American Manhattan Project, and creates the Combined Policy Committee and Combined Development Trust.

== 1944 ==
- September: Hyde Park Aide-Mémoire extends cooperation to the post-war era.

== 1945 ==
- July: Field Marshal Sir Henry Maitland Wilson authorises the use of nuclear weapons against Japan as a decision of the Combined Policy Committee.
- August: Bombing of Hiroshima and Nagasaki.
- August: Clement Attlee creates Advisory Coimmittee on Atomic Energy under the chairmanship of Sir John Anderson.
- October: Chiefs of Staff Committee recommend that Britain produce atomic weapons.
- November: Tube Alloys Directorate transferred to the Ministry of Supply.
- November: Washington Agreement confirms post-war collaboration; replaces the Quebec Agreement's requirement for "mutual consent" before using nuclear weapons with one for "prior consultation".

== 1946 ==
- February: British physicist Alan Nunn May is arrested as a Soviet spy after being fingered by Soviet defector Igor Gouzenko.
- March: Lord Portal becomes Controller of Production, Atomic Energy (CPAE).
- August: McMahon Act prohibits the US government releasing restricted data to any foreign power, thereby ending technical cooperation with the UK.

== 1947 ==
- January: Cabinet subcommittee approves the manufacture of nuclear weapons.
- June: Nine non-nuclear capable B-29 Superfortress bombers of the 97th Bombardment Group deploy to RAF Marham, beginning the presence of the Strategic Air Command in the United Kingdom.
- December: V bombers are ordered.

== 1948 ==
- January: Britain gives up the right to be consulted on the use of nuclear weapons as part of the Modus Vivendi.

== 1949 ==
- April: North Atlantic Treaty is signed.
- April: The first nuclear-capable B-29 bombers deploy to the UK.
- August: Soviet Union tests Joe-1, its first nuclear weapon.

== 1950 ==
- April: Aldermaston taken over; becomes centre of UK atomic weapons research.
- June: North Korea invades South Korea, starting the Korean War.

== 1951 ==
- June: Donald Maclean, who had served as a British member of the Combined Policy Committee from January 1947 to August 1948, defects to the Soviet Union.

== 1952 ==
- January: British-German physicist Klaus Fuchs is arrested and confesses to being a Soviet spy.
- June: United States Air Force in the United Kingdom receives its own nuclear weapons.
- October: First British nuclear weapon is tested in the Monte Bello Islands in Western Australia in Operation Hurricane.
- November: United States tests Ivy Mike, a thermonuclear device.

== 1953 ==
- October: Operation Totem, the first nuclear tests on the Australian mainland, conducted at Emu Field in the Great Victoria Desert in South Australia.

== 1954 ==
- July: British government decides to initiate a British hydrogen bomb programme.

== 1956 ==
- May–June: Operation Mosaics test in the Monte Bello Islands in the Australia.
- September–October: First British nuclear tests at Maralinga.
- October–November: Suez Crisis: Britain is forced to abandon invasion of Egypt under US financial pressure.

== 1957 ==
- April: 1957 Defence White Paper emphasises nuclear weapons to replace Britain's declining conventional military capabilities.
- May: First British hydrogen bomb test in Operation Grapple off Malden Island in the Pacific is a failure.
- May: Memorandum of Understanding with the US regarding the loan of nuclear weapons to the UK in wartime.
- September–October: Operation Antler Trials at Maralinga.
- October: Sputnik crisis erupts when Soviets launch the first artificial satellite.
- November: First successful British hydrogen bomb test off Christmas Island.

== 1958 ==
- July: MacMahon Act is amended to allow nuclear cooperation to resume and the 1958 US–UK Mutual Defence Agreement is signed, restoring the nuclear Special Relationship.
- September: Britain conducts its last atmospheric nuclear test off Malden Island.

== 1959 ==
- January: The first Thor missiles supplied to the UK by the US become operational.

== 1960 ==
- March: Harold Macmillan negotiates the purchase of Skybolt from the United States after the cancellation of Blue Streak in return for permission to base the US Navy's Polaris missile-equipped ballistic missile submarines at the Holy Loch in Scotland.
- October: Labour Party conference adopts a policy of unilateral nuclear disarmament.

== 1961 ==
- March: US Polaris submarines deploy to the Holy Loch.

== 1962 ==
- October: British nuclear forces on alert during the Cuban Missile Crisis.
- December: When the US moves to cancel Skybolt, Macmillan meets with President John F. Kennedy, and negotiates the Nassau Agreement, under which the UK is permitted to purchase Polaris missile technology.

== 1963 ==
- April: Polaris Sales Agreement is signed.
- August: The United Kingdom, along with the United States and the Soviet Union, signs the Partial Test Ban Treaty, which restricts it to underground nuclear tests by outlawing testing in the atmosphere, underwater, or in outer space.
- August: Last Thor missiles leave the UK.

== 1965 ==
- June: US 7th Air Division discontinued, ends Strategic Air Command presence in the UK except for visits.

== 1967 ==
- January: UK signs the Outer Space Treaty, banning nuclear weapons from space.

== 1968 ==
- July: UK signs the Non-proliferation treaty.

== 1973 ==
- April: Heath ministry approves the Chevaline programme to upgrade Polaris.

== 1979 ==
- January: US President Jimmy Carter agrees to sell the Trident I missile system to Britain.

== 1981 ==
- August: US President Ronald Reagan offers to sell the Trident II missile system to Britain.

== 1982 ==
- September–October: Labour Party Conference adopts a platform calling for the scrapping of Polaris and the cancellation of Trident.
- October: Trident sales agreement is signed.

== 1984 ==
- January: US cruise missiles are deployed to RAF Greenham Common and RAF Molesworth as a consequence of the 1979 NATO Double-Track Decision.

== 1988 ==
- June: Labour Party leader Neil Kinnock abandons the commitment to unilateral nuclear disarmament.

== 1991 ==
- November: Julin Bristol, the last British nuclear test, is conducted in the United States.

== 1992 ==
- March: The US Polaris submarine base at Holy Loch is closed.

== 1996 ==
- September: The UK signs the Comprehensive Test Ban Treaty, ending all nuclear testing.

== 1998 ==
- UK decommissions its tactical WE.177 bombs.

== 2006 ==
- December: Last US tactical nuclear weapons in the UK are removed.

== 2016 ==
- July: House of Commons votes to proceed with construction of this next generation of Trident submarines.
