= Yekaterinburg fireball =

2014 explosion of unknown origin in Russia

A massive fireball was recorded above Siberia, near Yekaterinburg, on November 14, 2014. The explosion apparently happened near the city of Rezh.

Various explanations have been proposed. The Russian Ministry for Emergency Situations said it was a ground explosion, but the Siberian Times, a local newspaper, reported that "the light was not accompanied by any sound". Regarding the meteoroid hypothesis, the Siberian Times also reported that "a local observatory indicated nothing fell from the sky on the day of the flash". Another hypothesis that was raised is that it was a high-altitude nuclear explosion.

The Siberian Times took the opinion that the incident was most likely related to the military burning expired gunpowder. Since no sounds were heard during the outbreaks, and the authorities did not try to influence information about these events, it is unlikely that it was a meteorite or a nuclear weapon. Journalists also mention the burning of gunpowder.

== See also ==
- Chelyabinsk meteor, 15 February 2013, also seen in Yekaterinburg
