= Bomb tower =

Tower built to hold a nuclear weapon for an aboveground nuclear test

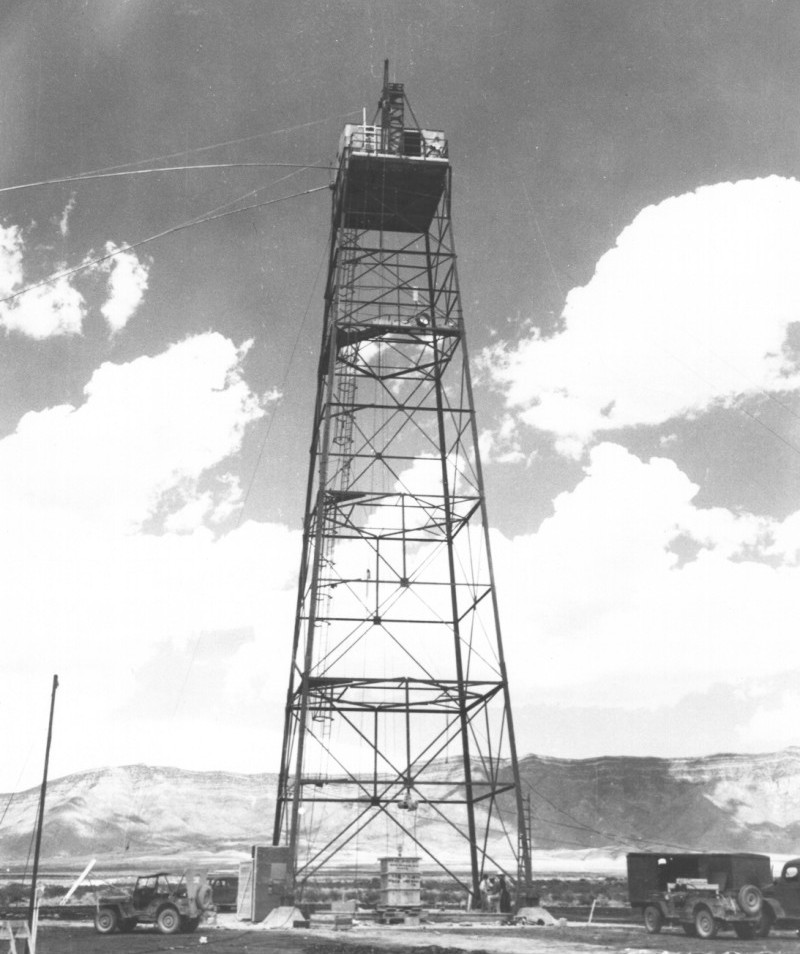
The tower used in the Trinity test, 1945.

A bomb tower is a lightly constructed tower, often 100 to 700 feet (30 to 210 meters) high, built to hold a nuclear weapon for an aboveground nuclear test. The tower holds the bomb for the purpose of the investigation of its destructive effects (such as burst height and distance with given explosive yield) and for the adjustment of measuring instruments, such as high-speed cameras. Normally, the bomb tower will disintegrate completely on detonation due to the enormous heat of the explosion.

== History ==
The bomb tower was used when the world's first nuclear explosion occurred on July 16, 1945, when a plutonium implosion device was tested at a site located 210 miles south of Los Alamos, New Mexico. The bomb tower used was entirely decimated with few traces to show it even existed after the test.
