= Forensic seismology =

Forensic seismology is the forensic use of the techniques of seismology to detect and study distant phenomena, particularly explosions, including those of nuclear weapons.

Because of the efficiency with which seismic waves propagate through the Earth and the technical difficulties of decoupling explosions to diminish their seismic radiation, forensic seismology is a critical technique in the enforcement of bans on underground nuclear testing.

In addition to nuclear explosions, the signatures of many other kinds of explosions can also be detected and analyzed by forensic seismology, and even other phenomena such as ocean waves (the global microseism), the movement of icebergs across the sea floor or in collision with other icebergs, or explosions within submarines.

Organizations with expertise in forensic seismology include AWE Blacknest, Los Alamos National Laboratory, Sandia National Laboratory, and Lawrence Livermore National Laboratory.

== Seismic detection of nuclear detonations ==
Forensic seismology is one of several other methods used by the global community to determine compliance with the Comprehensive Nuclear Test-Ban Treaty (CTBT). A network of approximately 170 seismic stations, along with data generated from sources such as infrasound, hydroacoustics, and radionuclide detection, is used to identify and locate nuclear detonations. Forensic seismology is specifically used to locate nuclear detonations that may have occurred underneath the ground.

Seismic stations record underground pressure waves and transmit this data for processing via secure communication links. There are many challenges involved with trying to differentiate a nuclear explosion from other natural and man-made phenomena, such as earthquakes, mining explosions, and construction. Nuclear explosions exceeding 150 kilotons generate pressure waves that primarily travel through the Earth's core and mantle. These types of explosions are straightforward to identify because the mixture of rock the signals pass through is fairly homogeneous and the signals generated are free from noise. Smaller nuclear explosions are more difficult to identify because pressure waves primarily travel through the Earth's upper mantle and crust, leading to signal distortion due to the heterogeneity of rocks at this depth.

Nations may also conduct clandestine underground tests that are not easily identifiable. One method of hiding an underground nuclear detonation is called decoupling. This involves detonating a nuclear warhead in an underground cavity in order to significantly muffle the amplitude of the subsequent underground pressure waves. Another proposed method of hiding nuclear detonations is called mine masking. This technique uses a larger explosion to mask a smaller nuclear explosion. The feasibility of mine masking has been called into question because seismic events large enough to mask a nuclear explosion are exceedingly rare and would draw suspicion. Smaller nuclear detonation yields may also be hard to detect because they produce readings similar to small earthquakes or other natural events.

When seismic data is gathered, it has to be processed to produce meaningful information. Algorithms are used to isolate patterns, remove noise, and generate estimates. The development of efficient algorithms for nuclear detonation detection has led to many advancements in other fields such as kriging, an advanced method of interpolation used primarily in geostatistics. Algorithms are used to identify key characteristics of wave forms, such as peak-to-peak distance, amplitude, phase, P wave amplitude, and S wave amplitude. P waves, or primary waves, are compression waves that propagate quickly through rock, and are generally the first waves to reach seismic stations. S waves, or shear waves, arrive after P waves. The ratio of P to S waves is one of several important values used to characterize seismic events. When a nuclear detonation has been identified, algorithms are used to estimate the detonation time, explosive yield and depth of burial.
