= British nuclear testing in the United States =

NTS series
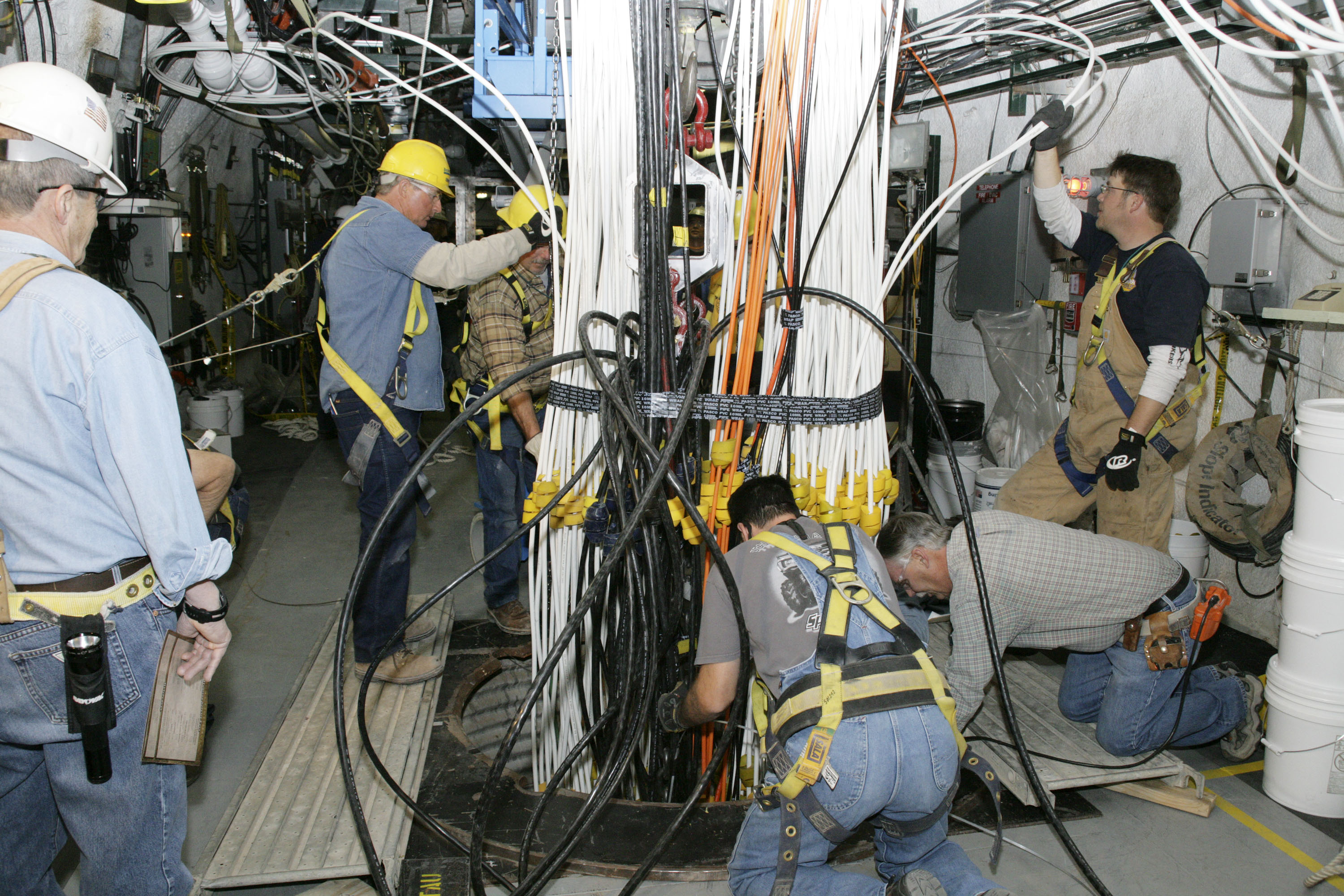
- Krakatau subcritical experiment being lowered into the floor of the tunnel of the U1a Complex at the Nevada Test Site (2006). The cables extending from the hole will carry data from the experiment to recording instruments.

Information
- Country: United Kingdom
- Test site: NTS Area 19, 20, Pahute Mesa; NTS, Areas 1–4, 6–10, Yucca Flat
- Period: 1962–1991
- Number of tests: 24
- Test type: underground shaft
- Max. yield: 140 kilotonnes of TNT (590 TJ)

Test series chronology

Following the success of Operation Grapple in which the United Kingdom became the third nation to acquire thermonuclear weapons after the United States and the Soviet Union, Britain launched negotiations with the US on a treaty under which both could share information and material to design, test and maintain their nuclear weapons. This effort culminated in the 1958 US–UK Mutual Defence Agreement. One of the results of that treaty was that Britain was allowed to use United States' Nevada Test Site for testing their designs and ideas, and received full support from the personnel there, in exchange for the data "take" from the experiment, a mutual condition. In effect the Nevada Test Site became Britain's test ground, subject only to advance planning and integrating their testing into that of the United States. This resulted in 24 underground tests at the Nevada Test Site from 1958 through the end of nuclear testing in the US in September 1992.

The United Kingdom signed the Comprehensive Nuclear Test Ban Treaty in 1996 and ratified it in 1998, confirming the British commitment towards ending nuclear test explosions in the world.

== Background ==
During the early part of the Second World War, Britain had a nuclear weapons project, codenamed Tube Alloys. At the Quebec Conference in August 1943, the Prime Minister, Winston Churchill and the President of the United States, Franklin Roosevelt, signed the Quebec Agreement, which merged Tube Alloys with the American Manhattan Project to create a combined British, American and Canadian project. The British government had trusted that the United States would continue to share nuclear technology, which it regarded as a joint discovery, but the United States Atomic Energy Act of 1946 (McMahon Act) ended technical cooperation. The British government feared that there might be a resurgence of United States isolationism, as had occurred after the First World War, in which case Britain might have to fight an aggressor alone, and that Britain might lose its great power status and its influence in world affairs. It therefore restarted its own development effort, now codenamed High Explosive Research.

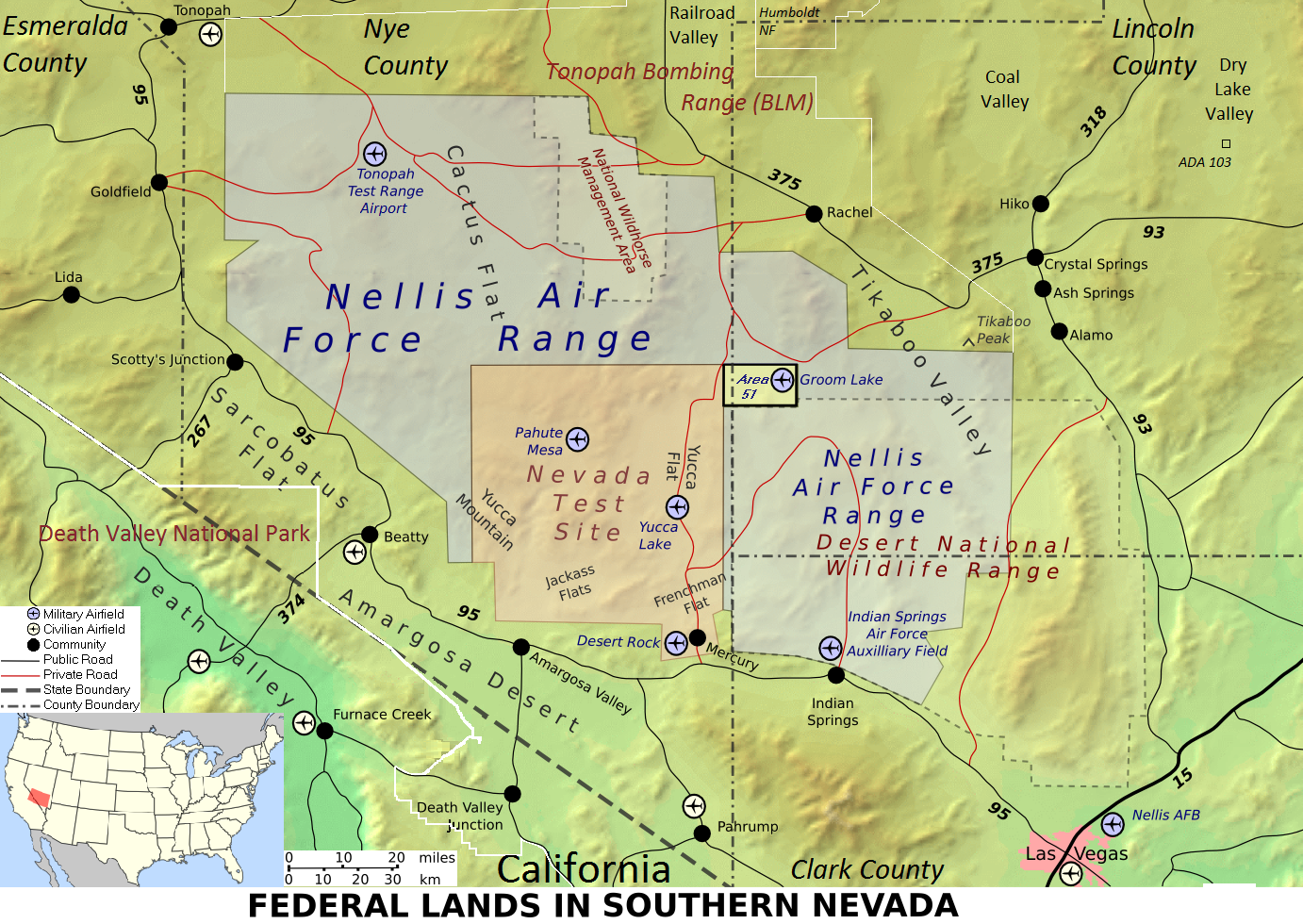
Federal lands in southern Nevada

Implicit in the decision to develop atomic bombs was the need to test them. Lacking open, thinly-populated areas, British officials considered locations overseas. The preferred site was the American Pacific Proving Grounds. A request to use it was sent to the American Joint Chiefs of Staff, but no reply was received until October 1950, when the Americans turned down the request. The uninhabited Monte Bello Islands in Australia were selected as an alternative. Meanwhile, negotiations continued with the Americans. Oliver Franks, the British Ambassador to the United States, lodged a formal request on 2 August 1951 for use of the Nevada Test Site. This was looked upon favourably by the United States Secretary of State, Dean Acheson, and the chairman of the United States Atomic Energy Commission (AEC), Gordon Dean, but opposed by the Robert A. Lovett, the Deputy Secretary of Defense and Robert LeBaron, the Deputy Secretary of Defence for Atomic Energy Affairs. In view of security concerns, Lovett and LeBaron wanted the tests to be conducted by Americans, with British participation limited to selected British scientists. President Harry S. Truman endorsed this counterproposal on 24 September 1951.

The Nevada Test Site would be cheaper than Monte Bello, although the cost would be paid in scarce dollars. Information gathered would have to be shared with the Americans, who would not share their own data. It would not be possible to test from a ship, and the political advantages in demonstrating that Britain could develop and test nuclear weapons without American assistance would be foregone, and the Americans were under no obligation to make the test site available for subsequent tests. Also, as Lord Cherwell noted, an American test meant that "in the lamentable event of the bomb failing to detonate, we should look very foolish indeed." In the end, Monte Bello was chosen, and the first British atomic bomb was tested there in Operation Hurricane on 3 October 1952. The next British test series, Operation Totem, was conducted at Emu Field in South Australia, but at their conclusion, the British government formally requested a permanent testing site from the Australian government, which led to the agreement on the use of the Maralinga test site in August 1954. The first of the British nuclear tests at Maralinga was held in September 1956.

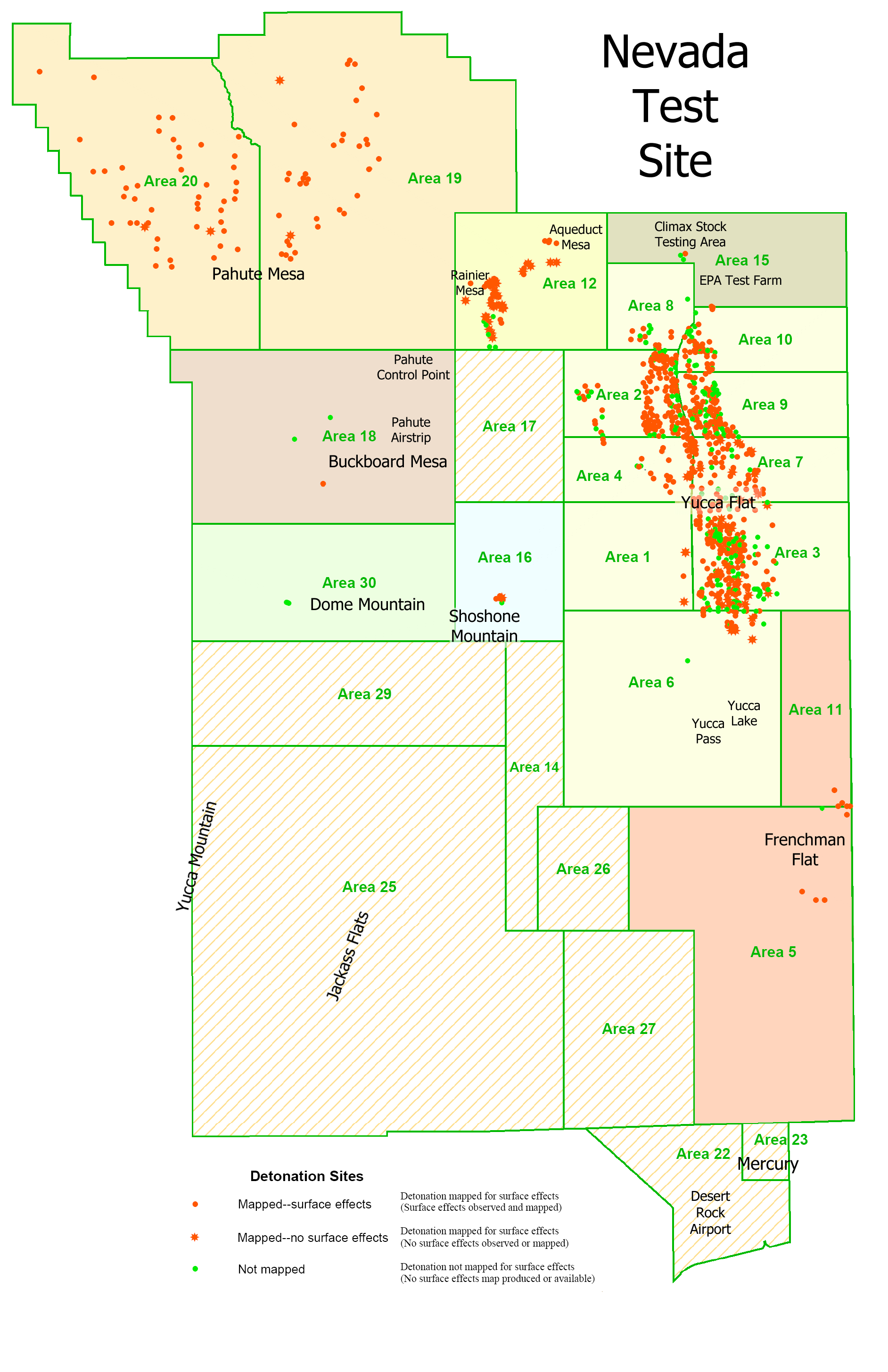
Map of the Nevada Test Site

While British atomic bomb development represented an extraordinary scientific and technological achievement, hopes that the United States would be sufficiently impressed to restore the nuclear Special Relationship were dashed. In November 1952, the United States conducted Ivy Mike, the first successful test of a true thermonuclear device or hydrogen bomb. Britain was therefore still several years behind in nuclear weapons technology. The Defence Policy Committee, chaired by Churchill and consisting of the senior Cabinet members, considered the political and strategic implications, and concluded that "we must maintain and strengthen our position as a world power so that Her Majesty's Government can exercise a powerful influence in the counsels of the world." In July 1954, Cabinet agreed to proceed with the development of thermonuclear weapons.

The Australian government would not permit thermonuclear tests in Australia, so Christmas Island in the Pacific was chosen for Operation Grapple, the testing of Britain's thermonuclear designs. The Grapple tests were facilitated by the United States, which also claimed the island. Although the initial tests were unsuccessful, the Grapple X test on 8 November 1957 achieved the desired result, and Britain became only the third nation to develop thermonuclear weapon technology. The British weapon makers had demonstrated all of the technologies that were needed to produce a megaton hydrogen bomb that weighed no more than 1 long ton (1.0 t) and was immune to premature detonation caused by nearby nuclear explosions. A one-year international moratorium commenced on 31 October 1958, and Britain never resumed atmospheric testing.

The Soviet Union's launch of Sputnik 1 on 4 October 1957, came as a tremendous shock to the American public, and amid the widespread calls for action in response to the Sputnik crisis, officials in the United States and Britain seized an opportunity to mend the Anglo-American relationship that had been damaged by the Suez Crisis the year before. The Prime Minister, Harold Macmillan, wrote to President Dwight D. Eisenhower on 10 October, urging that the two countries pool their resources, as Macmillan put it, to meet the Soviet challenge on every front, "military, economic and political."

The McMahon Act was amended to allow limited exchanges of nuclear weapons data and non-nuclear components of nuclear weapons to nations that had made substantial progress in the field. Only Britain qualified as a nation that had made substantial progress. The bill was signed into law by Eisenhower on 2 July 1958, and the 1958 US–UK Mutual Defence Agreement (MDA) was signed by Dulles and Samuel Hood, the British Minister in Washington, the following day, and approved by the United States Congress on 30 July, thus restoring the Special Relationship. Macmillan called it "the Great Prize".

== Testing ==
The MDA did not specifically address British nuclear testing at the Nevada Test Site (NTS), but it did provide a high-level framework for it to occur. The prospect was raised by the British Ambassador to the United States, Sir Roger Makins, at a meeting with the Chairman of the AEC, Glenn T. Seaborg, and Sir William Penney, the head of nuclear weapons development at the United Kingdom Atomic Energy Authority (UKAEA). On 3 November 1961, Macmillan wrote to President John F. Kennedy requesting the use of the Nevada Test Site for the testing of Super Octopus, a British kiloton warhead intended for use with the American Skybolt missile that was of great interest to weapon designers on both sides of the Atlantic. The response was positive, and on 8 February 1962, Seaborg announced, specifically referencing the MDA, that there would be a UK nuclear test at the NTS. This developed into a procedure for approval of a British nuclear test. The director of the British Atomic Weapons Research Establishment (AWRE) would lodge a request with the chairman of the AEC, who would then make a recommendation to the president through the Secretary of State and the Secretary of Defence. Every test had to be approved by the president and the National Security Council.

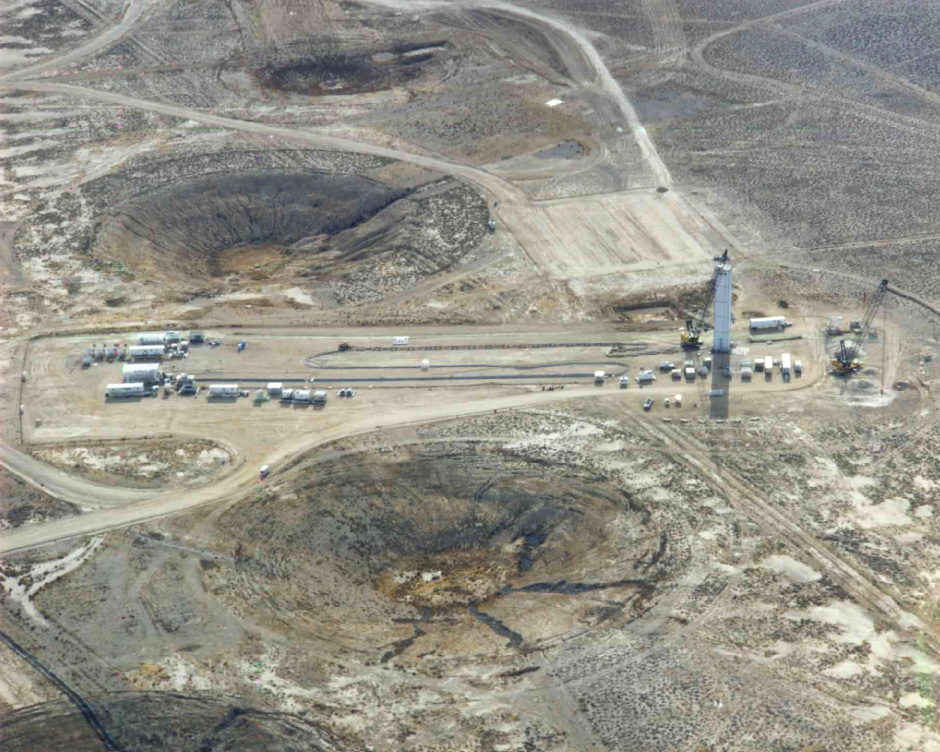
Preparing for an underground test at the Nevada Test Site. Final test preparations include running miles of cable downhole which will transmit vital test information to the diagnostic trailers to the left. A rack containing instrumentation to go downhole is assembled in the tower to the right. Subsidence craters from earlier underground tests dot the landscape.

A Joint Working Group (JOWOG) was set up to coordinate the British tests. Test safety and containment requirements remained a US Federal responsibility. The JOWOG therefore decided that the UK would provide the test device and diagnostics package, while the US would provide everything else, including the test canister and the data cables leading from it to the trailers with US recording equipment. This threw up issues regarding the interface between the British diagnostics package and the American recording equipment. There were also issues related to procedures, particularly with regard to the testing of electronic and mechanical devices. A further complicating factor was that the US had two rival nuclear weapons laboratories, the Los Alamos National Laboratory (LANL) and the Lawrence Livermore National Laboratory (LLNL), with different procedures.

For the first test, E. R. Drake Seager from the AWRE was designated the trial superintendent and Robert Campbell from LANL was designated the test director, these being the styles of the heads of the British and American teams. The test, codenamed Pampas, was conducted on 1 March 1962. It was Britain's first underground test. The new Super Octopus implosion system worked but the overall result was disappointing. The RO.106 (Tony) warhead was based on the American Tsetse warhead, but used a different, safer but less powerful conventional explosive, EDC11. The result was that the yield was less than Tsetse, and too small to be used as the primary in the Skybolt warhead. A follow-up test of what became the basis for the WE.177 design codenamed Tendrac therefore took place on 7 December 1962, and was judged a success.

Subcritical tests were tests with nuclear weapons that did not involve a nuclear explosion. Safety tests involved testing the impact of fire, shock and other accidents against live nuclear weapons. These did not intentionally involve nuclear explosions, although there was always a danger. Tim subcritical tests and Vixen safety tests related to WE.177 were conducted at Maralinga in March and April 1963, but four more British safety tests were conducted in 1963 at the NTS Tonopah Test Range as part of Operation Roller Coaster: Double Tracks on 15 May, Clean Slate 1 on 25 May, Clean Slate 2 on 31 May and Clean Slate 3 on 9 June. The Partial Nuclear Test Ban Treaty, which went into effect on 10 October 1963, banned atmospheric nuclear testing, and the Maralinga range was closed for good in 1967.

The Polaris Sales Agreement, which was signed in Washington, DC, on 6 April 1963, meant that a new warhead was required. The Skybolt warhead tested in Tendrac had to be redesigned with a Re-Entry System (RES) that could be fitted to a Polaris missile, at an estimated cost of between £30 million and £40 million. The alternative was to make a British copy of the W58. While the AWRE was familiar with the W47 warhead used in the A2 Polaris missile, it knew nothing of the W58 used in the A3 which the British government had decided to buy. A presidential determination was required to release information on the W58 under the MDA, but with this in hand, a mission led by John Challens, the Chief of Warhead Development at the AWRE, visited the LLNL from 22 to 24 January 1963, and was shown details of the W58. However a carbon copy of the American design was not possible, as the British used a different conventional explosive, and British fissile material was of a different composition of isotopes of plutonium. A new warhead had to be designed. It was given a fission primary codenamed Katie and fusion secondary codenamed Reggie. The whole warhead was given the designation ET.317.

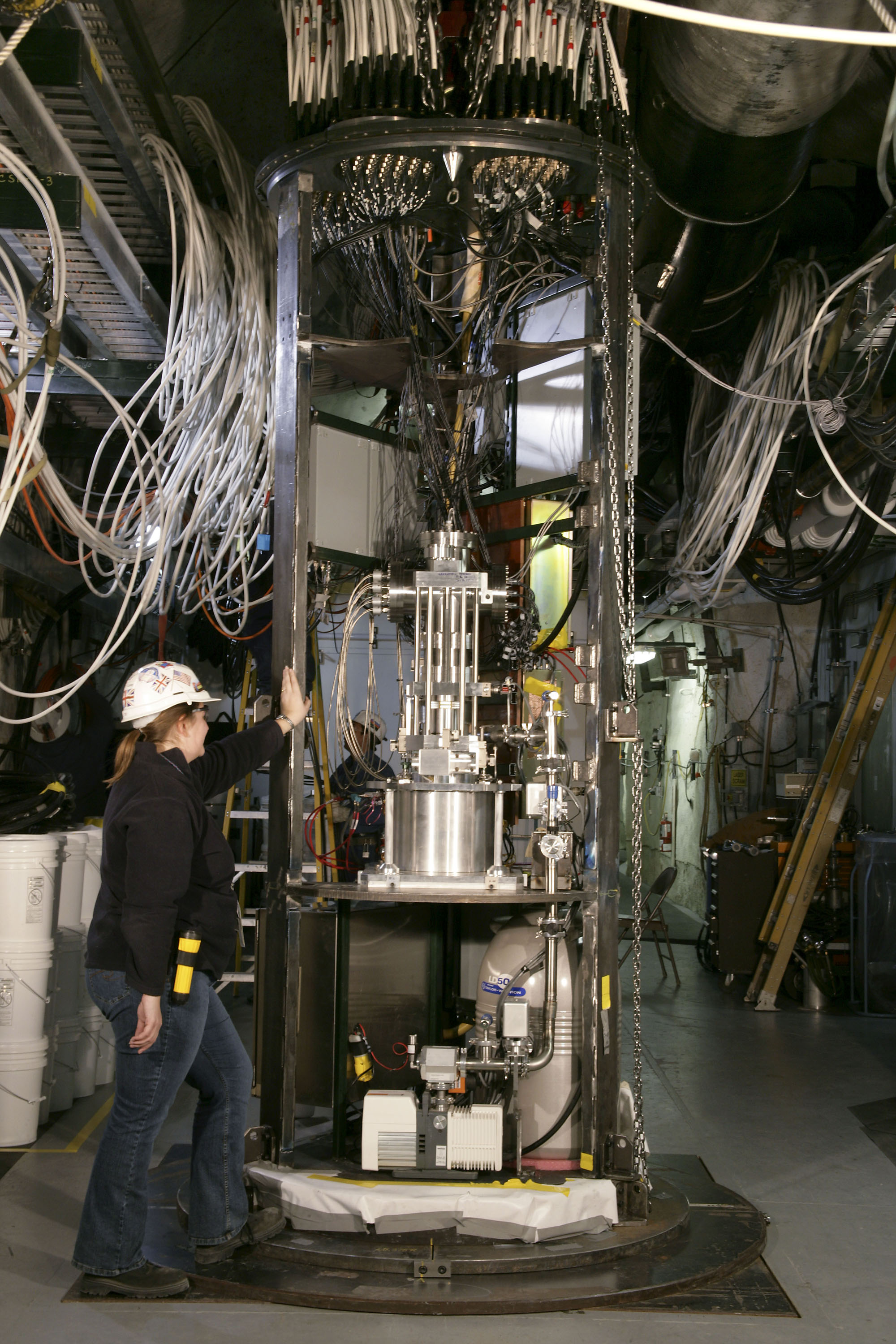
The Krakatau subcritical experiment is prepared to be lowered into the tunnel of the U1a Complex at the Nevada Test Site

A new test series was required, which was conducted with the LANL. The first was Whetstone Commorant on 17 July 1964. It was followed by Whetstone Courser on 25 September. The latter used an ET.317 Katie, but with 0.45 kg less plutonium. The test was a failure due to a fault in the American-made neutron initiators, and had to be repeated in the Flintlock Charcoal test on 10 September 1965. This test had to be authorised by the Prime Minister, Harold Wilson, and his cabinet. Charcoal produced the highest yield of any UK nuclear test at NTS up to that date. The design saved 166 kg of plutonium across the Polaris warhead stockpile, and reduced the cost of its production by £2.5 million. This was the last UK nuclear test for nine years; in 1965, Wilson suspended all nuclear testing on the grounds that it was unnecessary.

In November 1972, the British government secured permission to conduct three more tests at the NTS as part of the Super Antelope, a component of the Chevaline programme, which aimed to harden the UK Polaris missiles against Soviet countermeasures. The first test was Arbor Fallon on 17 July 1974, which was conducted in collaboration with LLNL, as it was the designer of the original Polaris warhead. It was Anvil Banon on 26 August 1976 and Cresset Fondutta 11 April 1978. These aimed to produce a lighter weight which would therefore have the same or greater range than the original ET.317, as shorter range drastically reduced the sea room in which the submarines could operate. A complication arose in 1976 in the form of the Threshold Test Ban Treaty, which limited tests to 150 kilotonnes of TNT (630 TJ). Three more tests of Chevaline were subsequently added. Quicksilver Quargel on 20 November 1978 was a test of a warhead which could survive a high-speed re-entry. It worked as designed, producing a yield of 47 kilotonnes of TNT (200 TJ). Quicksilver Nessel on 29 August 1979 tested a new lightweight primary, which was of great interest to the Americans. Finally, there was Tinderbox Colwick on 26 April 1980.

Starting with Guardian Dutchess on 24 October 1980, British tests were aimed at developing a warhead for a UK Trident missile system. The decision to acquire Trident meant that from 1978, British designers had access to American data on the effects of nuclear weapons on military systems, which had significant effect on designs. The shift to Trident meant that after six tests in collaboration with LLNL, the British testing now switched back to collaboration with LANL. Starting with Cresset Fondutta testing moved out to the Pahute Mesa, where tests could be conducted with less seismic impact on populated areas such as Las Vegas. Tests in Areas 19 and 20 involved travelling up to 60 miles (97 km) from the base camp in Mercury, Nevada. After the Praetorian Rousanne test with LANL on 12 November 1981, LLNL again became the American partner, starting with Praetorian Gibne on 12 April 1982. The final test at NTS was Julin Bristol on 26 November 1991.

In all, 24 British nuclear tests were conducted at the NTS.

== Subcritical testing ==
Preparations were under way for another test in 1992 when President George H. W. Bush announced a moratorium on testing, much to the surprise of both American and British personnel at the NTS. This moratorium was extended by his successor, President Bill Clinton. In 1996, the United States signed the Comprehensive Nuclear Test Ban Treaty (CTBT), but the US Senate failed to ratify it in 1999. The United Kingdom signed the CTBT in 1996, and ratified it in 1998 becoming, with France, the first two of the five declared nuclear-weapon states to ratify it. This ratification confirmed the UK commitment towards ending nuclear test explosions in the world.

Subcritical tests are any type of tests involving nuclear materials and possibly chemical high explosives that purposely result in no yield. The name refers to the lack of creation of a critical mass of fissile material. They are the only type of tests allowed under the interpretation of the CTBT tacitly agreed to by the major atomic powers. Subcritical British nuclear tests in the United States continued, notably Etna (Vito) on 14 February 2002 and Krakatau on 23 February 2006.

== Summary ==
United Kingdom's NTS series tests and detonations
Name	Date time (UTC)	Local time zone	Location	Elevation + height	Delivery, Purpose	Device	Yield	Fallout	References
Nougat/Pampas	1 March 1962 19:10:00.09	PST (-8 hrs)	NTS Area U3al 37°02′28″N 116°01′46″W	1,196 m (3,924 ft) - 363.14 m (1,191.4 ft)	underground shaft	WE.177	9.5 kt	Venting detected off site, 2 kCi (74 TBq)	
Storax/Tendrac	7 December 1962 19:00:00.1	PST (-8 hrs)	NTS Area U3ba 37°03′06″N 116°01′48″W	1,202 m (3,944 ft) - 302.67 m (993.0 ft)	underground shaft		10 kt		
Whetstone/Cormorant	17 July 1964 17:18:30.03	PST (-8 hrs)	NTS Area U3df 37°01′03″N 116°01′46″W	1,184 m (3,885 ft) - 271.64 m (891.2 ft)	underground shaft		2 kt	Venting detected on site, 11 Ci (410 GBq)	
Whetstone/Courser	25 September 1964 17:02:00.03	PST (-8 hrs)	NTS Area U3do 37°04′21″N 116°00′58″W	1,237 m (4,058 ft) - 358.99 m (1,177.8 ft)	underground shaft		no yield		
Flintlock/Charcoal	10 September 1965 17:12:00.03	PST (-8 hrs)	NTS Area U7g 37°04′41″N 116°01′03″W	1,245 m (4,085 ft) - 455.44 m (1,494.2 ft)	underground shaft, weapons development	Polaris warhead?	29 kt		
Arbor/Fallon	23 May 1974 13:38:30.164	PST (-8 hrs)	NTS Area U2dv 37°07′28″N 116°04′47″W	1,276 m (4,186 ft) - 466.04 m (1,529.0 ft)	underground shaft, weapons development	Chevaline warhead?	20 kt	Venting detected, 72 Ci (2,700 GBq)	
Anvil/Banon	26 August 1976 14:30:00.168	PST (-8 hrs)	NTS Area U2dz 37°07′31″N 116°04′59″W	1,275 m (4,183 ft) - 536.4 m (1,760 ft)	underground shaft, weapons development	Chevaline warhead?	51 kt	Venting detected, 6 Ci (220 GBq)	
Cresset/Fondutta	11 April 1978 15:30:00.161	PST (-8 hrs)	NTS Area U19zs 37°17′59″N 116°19′36″W	2,072 m (6,798 ft) - 633.07 m (2,077.0 ft)	underground shaft, weapons development	Chevaline warhead?	67 kt		
Quicksilver/Quargel	18 November 1978 19:00:00.166	PST (-8 hrs)	NTS Area U2fb 37°07′36″N 116°05′05″W	1,275 m (4,183 ft) - 542 m (1,778 ft)	underground shaft	Chevaline warhead?	38 kt	Venting detected, 7 Ci (260 GBq)	
Quicksilver/Nessel	29 August 1979 15:08:00.171	PST (-8 hrs)	NTS Area U2ep 37°07′16″N 116°04′00″W	1,260 m (4,130 ft) - 464 m (1,522 ft)	underground shaft	Chevaline warhead?	20 kt	Venting detected	
Tinderbox/Colwick	26 April 1980 17:00:00.083	PST (-8 hrs)	NTS Area U20ac 37°14′54″N 116°25′23″W	1,946 m (6,385 ft) - 633 m (2,077 ft)	underground shaft	Chevaline warhead?	140 kt	Venting detected	
Guardian/Dutchess	24 October 1980 19:15:00.116	PST (-8 hrs)	NTS Area U7bm 37°04′28″N 116°00′00″W	1,265 m (4,150 ft) - 426.72 m (1,400.0 ft)	underground shaft		10 kt		
Guardian/Serpa	17 December 1980 15:10:00.086	PST (-8 hrs)	NTS Area U19ai 37°19′29″N 116°18′58″W	2,028 m (6,654 ft) - 572.7 m (1,879 ft)	underground shaft	Chevaline warhead?	35 kt		
Praetorian/Rousanne	12 November 1981 15:00:00.1	PST (-8 hrs)	NTS Area U4p 37°06′29″N 116°03′00″W	1,243 m (4,078 ft) - 517.2 m (1,697 ft)	underground shaft	Chevaline warhead?	77 kt		
Praetorian/Gibne	25 April 1982 18:05:00.008	PST (-8 hrs)	NTS Area U20ah 37°15′21″N 116°25′24″W	1,937 m (6,355 ft) - 570 m (1,870 ft)	underground shaft	Chevaline warhead?	89 kt	Venting detected, 0.1 Ci (3.7 GBq)	
Phalanx/Armada	22 April 1983 13:53:00.085	PST (-8 hrs)	NTS Area U9cs 37°06′41″N 116°01′23″W	1,296 m (4,252 ft) - 265 m (869 ft)	underground shaft	Trident warhead?	1.5 kt	I-131 venting detected, 0	
Fusileer/Mundo	1 May 1984 19:05:00.093	PST (-8 hrs)	NTS Area U7bo 37°06′22″N 116°01′24″W	1,292 m (4,239 ft) - 566 m (1,857 ft)	underground shaft, weapons development	Trident warhead?	77 kt		
Grenadier/Egmont	9 December 1984 19:40:00.089	PST (-8 hrs)	NTS Area U20al 37°16′12″N 116°29′55″W	1,839 m (6,033 ft) - 546 m (1,791 ft)	underground shaft, weapons development	Trident warhead?	103 kt		
Charioteer/Kinibito	5 December 1985 15:00:00.067	PST (-8 hrs)	NTS Area U3me 37°03′11″N 116°02′47″W	1,208 m (3,963 ft) - 579.42 m (1,901.0 ft)	underground shaft, weapons development	Trident warhead?	110 kt		
Charioteer/Darwin	25 June 1986 20:27:45.092	PST (-8 hrs)	NTS Area U20aq 37°15′52″N 116°30′02″W	1,849 m (6,066 ft) - 548.95 m (1,801.0 ft)	underground shaft, weapons development	Trident warhead?	89 kt		
Musketeer/Midland	16 July 1987 19:00:00.077	PST (-8 hrs)	NTS Area U7by 37°06′13″N 116°01′27″W	1,284 m (4,213 ft) - 486.77 m (1,597.0 ft)	underground shaft	Trident warhead?	20 kt		
Aqueduct/Barnwell	8 December 1989 15:00:00.087	PST (-8 hrs)	NTS Area U20az 37°13′52″N 116°24′37″W	2,031 m (6,663 ft) - 600.8 m (1,971 ft)	underground shaft, weapons development	Trident warhead?	120 kt	Venting detected, 0.1 Ci (3.7 GBq)	
Sculpin/Houston	14 November 1990 19:17:00.071	PST (-8 hrs)	NTS Area U19az 37°13′38″N 116°22′20″W	2,031 m (6,663 ft) - 594.4 m (1,950 ft)	underground shaft, weapons development	Trident warhead?	103 kt	Venting detected	
Julin/Bristol	26 November 1991 18:35:00.073	PST (-8 hrs)	NTS Area U4av 37°05′47″N 116°04′14″W	1,246 m (4,088 ft) - 457 m (1,499 ft)	underground shaft, weapons development	Trident Low Yield warhead?	11 kt		
