= Operation Vixen =

Vixen

Information
- Country: United Kingdom
- Test site: Maralinga Range, South Australia
- Period: 1959-1963
- Number of tests: 13
- Test type: dry surface
- Max. yield: 0

Test series chronology

The Vixen series of nuclear tests were all safety experiments, in which a bomb mechanism with a live core was subjected to abnormal conditions, such as fire, shock, and electrical malfunctions to determine whether nuclear criticality would occur. The result is no nuclear criticality, but the high explosives that triggered the fission bomb may explode, destroying the bomb and spreading the core material over a localized area.

United Kingdom's Vixen series tests and detonations
Name (Note: The US, France and Great Britain have code-named their test events, while the USSR and China did not, and therefore have only test numbers (with some exceptions – Soviet peaceful explosions were named). Word translations into English in parentheses unless the name is a proper noun. A dash followed by a number indicates a member of a salvo event. The US also sometimes named the individual explosions in such a salvo test, which results in "name1 – 1(with name2)". If test is canceled or aborted, then the row data like date and location discloses the intended plans, where known.)	Date time (UT)	Local time zone (Note: To convert the UT time into standard local, add the number of hours in parentheses to the UT time; for local daylight saving time, add one additional hour. If the result is earlier than 00:00, add 24 hours and subtract 1 from the day; if it is 24:00 or later, subtract 24 hours and add 1 to the day.)	Location (Note: Rough place name and a latitude/longitude reference; for rocket-carried tests, the launch location is specified before the detonation location, if known. Some locations are extremely accurate; others (like airdrops and space blasts) may be quite inaccurate. "~" indicates a likely pro-forma rough location, shared with other tests in that same area.)	Elevation + height (Note: Elevation is the ground level at the point directly below the explosion relative to sea level; height is the additional distance added or subtracted by tower, balloon, shaft, tunnel, air drop or other contrivance. For rocket bursts the ground level is "N/A". In some cases it is not clear if the height is absolute or relative to ground, for example, Plumbbob/John. No number or units indicates the value is unknown, while "0" means zero. Sorting on this column is by elevation and height added together.)	Delivery, (Note: Atmospheric, airdrop, balloon, gun, cruise missile, rocket, surface, tower, and barge are all disallowed by the Partial Nuclear Test Ban Treaty. Sealed shaft and tunnel are underground, and remained useful under the PTBT. Intentional cratering tests are borderline; they occurred under the treaty, were sometimes protested, and generally overlooked if the test was declared to be a peaceful use.) Purpose (Note: Include weapons development, weapon effects, safety test, transport safety test, war, science, joint verification and industrial/peaceful, which may be further broken down.)	Device (Note: Designations for test items where known, "?" indicates some uncertainty about the preceding value, nicknames for particular devices in quotes. This category of information is often not officially disclosed.)	Yield (Note: Estimated energy yield in tons, kilotons, and megatons. A ton of TNT equivalent is defined as 4.184 gigajoules (1 gigacalorie).)	Fallout (Note: Radioactive emission to the atmosphere aside from prompt neutrons, where known. The measured species is only iodine-131 if mentioned, otherwise it is all species. No entry means unknown, probably none if underground and "all" if not; otherwise notation for whether measured on the site only or off the site, where known, and the measured amount of radioactivity released.)	References	Notes
A (31 separate events)	1959 through 1961	aCST (9.5 hrs)	Maralinga Range, South Australia: Wewak 29.956°S 131.716°E	180 m (590 ft) + 1 m (3 ft 3 in)	dry surface, safety experiment		unknown yield			31 trials investigating criticality of a burning warhead, disbursed 4.2 kg (9.3 lb) beryllium, 68 kg (150 lb) U-238, .58 kg (1.3 lb) plutonium, 99 Ci (3,700 GBq) of Po-210 and 1.96 curies (73 GBq) of Ac-227.
B1	7 September 1960 23:20:??	aCST (9.5 hrs)	Maralinga Range, South Australia: Taranaki D 29.8922°S 131.5917°E	180 m (590 ft) + 2.5 m (8 ft 2 in)	dry surface, safety experiment		no yield			The Vixen B series investigated safety of bombs when the explosives are fired by other than the expected normal ignition sequence. Total disbursement across all 12 tests was 22.2 kg (49 lb) plutonium,.
B2	24 September 1960 22:40:??	aCST (9.5 hrs)	Maralinga Range, South Australia: Taranaki C 29.8925°S 131.593°E	180 m (590 ft) + 2.5 m (8 ft 2 in)	dry surface, safety experiment		no yield			22.4 kg (49 lb) U-235, 24.9 kg (55 lb) U-238, 17.6 kg (39 lb) beryllium. 90% of the debbursements from the tests was buried in pits (later opened in Operation Brumby), and 10% disbursed to the environment.
B3	3 October 1960 07:50:??	aCST (9.5 hrs)	Maralinga Range, South Australia: Taranaki E 29.8925°S 131.5903°E	180 m (590 ft) + 2.5 m (8 ft 2 in)	dry surface, safety experiment		no yield			
B1 - Lima 1	13 April 1961 11:44:??	aCST (9.5 hrs)	Maralinga Range, South Australia: Taranaki H 29.8926°S 131.5917°E	180 m (590 ft) + 2.5 m (8 ft 2 in)	dry surface, safety experiment		no yield			
B1 - Lima 2	23 April 1961 05:00:??	aCST (9.5 hrs)	Maralinga Range, South Australia: Taranaki G 29.8929°S 131.5927°E	180 m (590 ft) + 2.5 m (8 ft 2 in)	dry surface, safety experiment		no yield			
B1 - Lima 3	8 May 1961 12:00:??	aCST (9.5 hrs)	Maralinga Range, South Australia: Taranaki B 29.8934°S 131.5939°E	180 m (590 ft) + 2.5 m (8 ft 2 in)	dry surface, safety experiment		no yield			
B1 - Lima 4	18 May 1961 07:30:??	aCST (9.5 hrs)	Maralinga Range, South Australia: Taranaki J 29.8928°S 131.5906°E	180 m (590 ft) + 2.5 m (8 ft 2 in)	dry surface, safety experiment		no yield			
B1 - Lima 5	25 May 1961 05:30:??	aCST (9.5 hrs)	Maralinga Range, South Australia: Taranaki F 29.8933°S 131.5893°E	180 m (590 ft) + 2.5 m (8 ft 2 in)	dry surface, safety experiment		no yield			
B3 - Lima 1	26 March 1963 00:20:??	aCST (9.5 hrs)	Maralinga Range, South Australia: Taranaki PD 29.893°S 131.5917°E	180 m (590 ft) + 2.5 m (8 ft 2 in)	dry surface, safety experiment		no yield			
B3 - Lima 2	2 April 1963 06:15:??	aCST (9.5 hrs)	Maralinga Range, South Australia: Taranaki PE 29.8932°S 131.5908°E	180 m (590 ft) + 2.5 m (8 ft 2 in)	dry surface, safety experiment		no yield			
B3 - Lima 3	9 April 1963 05:10:??	aCST (9.5 hrs)	Maralinga Range, South Australia: Taranaki PC 29.8932°S 131.5925°E	180 m (590 ft) + 2.5 m (8 ft 2 in)	dry surface, safety experiment		no yield			
B3 - Lima 4	14 April 1963 03:54:??	aCST (9.5 hrs)	Maralinga Range, South Australia: Taranaki M 29.8935°S 131.5897°E	180 m (590 ft) + 2.5 m (8 ft 2 in)	dry surface, safety experiment		no yield			
