= The Siberian Times =

Russian online newspaper in English

- All about Siberia, in English
- Type: Online newspaper
- Editor: Svetlana Skarbo
- Founded: 12 July 2012
- Ceased publication: 1 April 2024
- Language: English
- City: Novosibirsk
- Country: Russia

The Siberian Times was an English-language online newspaper founded on 12 July 2012 in Novosibirsk, Russia. According to the editor of the website, Svetlana Skarbo, their aim is to challenge stereotypes about Siberia, which she believed were "negative and out of date".

== History ==
The Siberian Times described their organisation as a "major new source of news, features and opinions from Russia's largest region", with news articles produced by both Russian and Western journalists, alongside researchers.

Mashable once described The Siberian Times's reporting as "allegedly real with a bit of hyperbole/Siberian fan fiction thrown in — just as it should be". Meduza found that the site was run by an individual named Will Stewart who employed freelancers to rewrite tabloid stories from Russian media outlets.

Nevertheless, some of The Siberian Times's articles have garnered the attention of Western media outlets, such as an article about frozen worms becoming reanimated following the thawing of permafrost. This story was reported by Smithsonian, although a separate claim was made by the academic journal Doklady Biological Sciences.

Other Siberian Times stories have been picked up by Radio Free Europe/Radio Liberty, The Daily Telegraph, The Independent and Business Insider.

According to the Wayback Machine's records, The Siberian Times has ceased operation on 1 April 2024.
