= Operation Buster–Jangle =

Series of 1950s US nuclear tests

- Buster–Jangle Easy, 31 kilotons.

Information
- Country: United States
- Test site: NTS, Areas 1–4, 6–10, Yucca Flat
- Period: 1951
- Number of tests: 7
- Test type: cratering, dry surface, free air drop, tower
- Max. yield: 31 kilotonnes of TNT (130 TJ)

Test series chronology

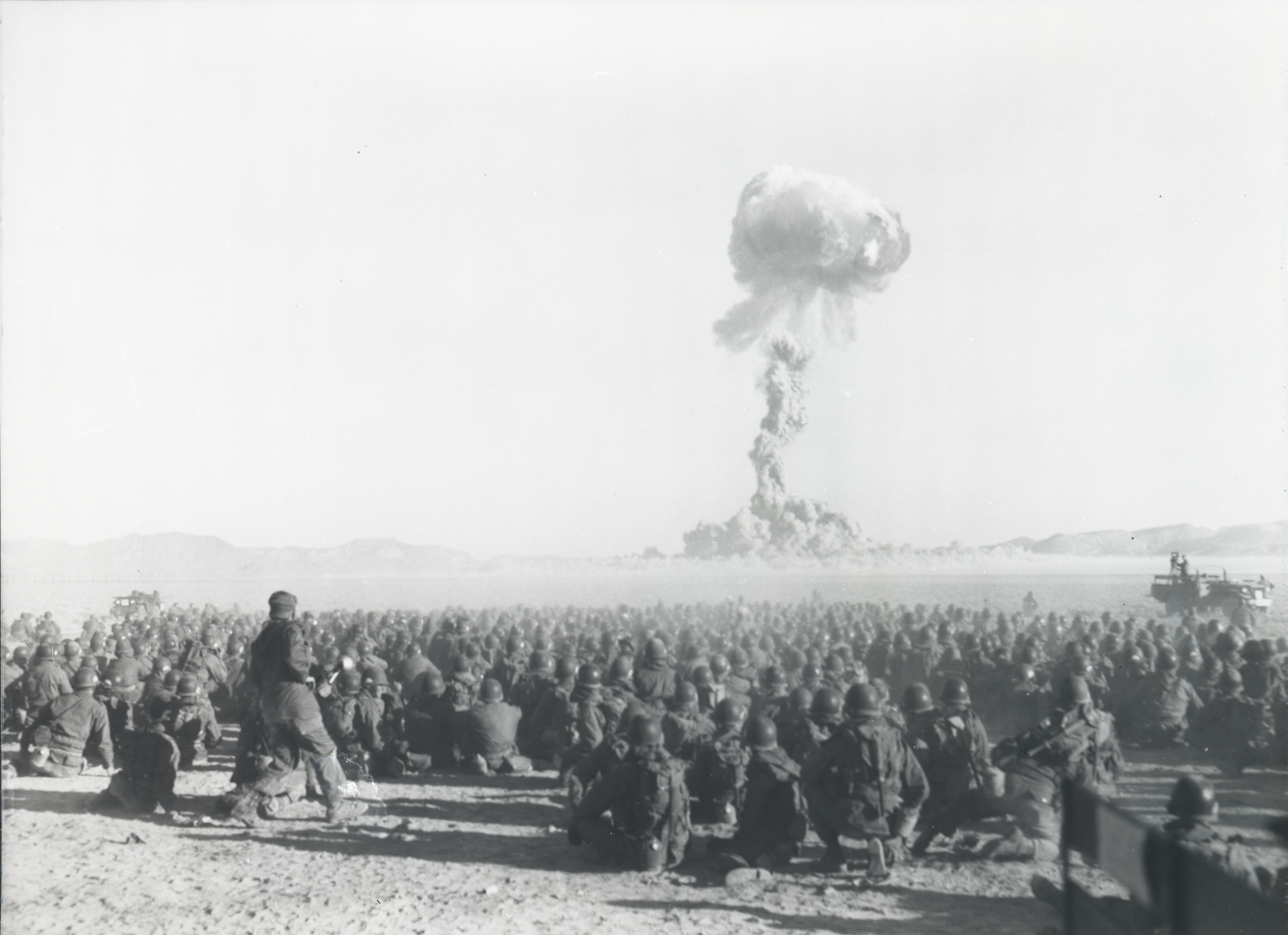
Exercise Desert Rock I during the Buster Dog test.

Operation Buster–Jangle was a series of seven (six atmospheric, one cratering) nuclear weapons tests conducted by the United States in late 1951 at the Nevada Test Site. Buster–Jangle was the first joint test program between the DOD (Operation Buster) and Los Alamos National Laboratories (Operation Jangle). As part of Operation Buster, 6,500 troops were involved in the Operation Desert Rock I, II, and III exercises in conjunction with the tests. The last two tests, Operation Jangle, evaluated the cratering effects of low-yield nuclear devices. This series preceded Operation Tumbler–Snapper and followed Operation Greenhouse.

== US ground forces involvement ==
Four U.S. Army units took part in the Operation Buster–Jangle "Dog" test for combat maneuvers after the detonation of a nuclear weapon took place. These units consisted of:

1. 1st Battalion 188th Airborne Infantry Regiment 11th Airborne Division
2. 3rd Medical Platoon 188th Airborne Medical Company
3. Platoon Company A 127th Engineer Battalion
4. Battery C 546th Field Artillery Battalion

Personnel were instructed to create foxholes and construct gun emplacements and bunkers in a defensive position 11 km south of the detonation area. After the nuclear bomb was detonated, the troops were ordered to move forward towards the affected area. While traveling closer to ground zero, troops witnessed the nuclear weapon's effects on the fortifications that were placed in the location in preparation for the tests. The ground troops got as close as 900 meters from ground zero before they were instructed to move out of the area. The Human Resources Research Office was tasked with gathering data on the psychological experiences of the troops after witnessing such a detonation and moving closer towards the affected area.

=== Radiation protection standards ===
For the Operation Buster–Jangle series of tests, the Atomic Energy Commission created a set of criteria that must be followed if exposing armed forces, or civilians to the harmful effects of ionizing radiation.

- Orientation and proper radiological training
- Dispersion of dosimeters amongst personnel
- Utilization of radiological protective equipment and clothing
- Active monitoring of radiological levels
- Briefing of personnel taking part in the exercise
- Decontamination of radioactive debris

A majority of the personnel that took part in the exercise received around 3 R, with pilots receiving an average of 3.9 R. These estimates vary given the differing data provided by the Department of Defense over the years.

United States' Buster–Jangle series tests and detonations
Name (Note: The US, France and Great Britain have code-named their test events, while the USSR and China did not, and therefore have only test numbers (with some exceptions – Soviet peaceful explosions were named). Word translations into English in parentheses unless the name is a proper noun. A dash followed by a number indicates a member of a salvo event. The US also sometimes named the individual explosions in such a salvo test, which results in "name1 – 1(with name2)". If test is canceled or aborted, then the row data like date and location discloses the intended plans, where known.)	Date time (UT)	Local time zone (Note: To convert the UT time into standard local, add the number of hours in parentheses to the UT time; for local daylight saving time, add one additional hour. If the result is earlier than 00:00, add 24 hours and subtract 1 from the day; if it is 24:00 or later, subtract 24 hours and add 1 to the day. Historical time zone data obtained from the IANA time zone database.)	Location (Note: Rough place name and a latitude/longitude reference; for rocket-carried tests, the launch location is specified before the detonation location, if known. Some locations are extremely accurate; others (like airdrops and space blasts) may be quite inaccurate. "~" indicates a likely pro-forma rough location, shared with other tests in that same area.)	Elevation + height (Note: Elevation is the ground level at the point directly below the explosion relative to sea level; height is the additional distance added or subtracted by tower, balloon, shaft, tunnel, air drop or other contrivance. For rocket bursts the ground level is "N/A". In some cases it is not clear if the height is absolute or relative to ground, for example, Plumbbob/John. No number or units indicates the value is unknown, while "0" means zero. Sorting on this column is by elevation and height added together.)	Delivery, (Note: Atmospheric, airdrop, balloon, gun, cruise missile, rocket, surface, tower, and barge are all disallowed by the Partial Nuclear Test Ban Treaty. Sealed shaft and tunnel are underground, and remained useful under the PTBT. Intentional cratering tests are borderline; they occurred under the treaty, were sometimes protested, and generally overlooked if the test was declared to be a peaceful use.) Purpose (Note: Include weapons development, weapon effects, safety test, transport safety test, war, science, joint verification and industrial/peaceful, which may be further broken down.)	Device (Note: Designations for test items where known, "?" indicates some uncertainty about the preceding value, nicknames for particular devices in quotes. This category of information is often not officially disclosed.)	Yield (Note: Estimated energy yield in tons, kilotons, and megatons. A ton of TNT equivalent is defined as 4.184 gigajoules (1 gigacalorie).)	Fallout (Note: Radioactive emission to the atmosphere aside from prompt neutrons, where known. The measured species is only iodine-131 if mentioned, otherwise it is all species. No entry means unknown, probably none if underground and "all" if not; otherwise notation for whether measured on the site only or off the site, where known, and the measured amount of radioactivity released.)	References	Notes
Able	October 22, 1951 14:00:00.0	PST (−8 hrs)	NTS Area 7 37.0838°N 116.0248°W	1,280 m (4,200 ft) + 30 m (98 ft)	tower, weapons development	Mk-6 "Puny Plutonium"	0.05 kt			Minimum mass design, fizzle (yield "less than a pound"); yet it yielded a lower bound on viable plutonium mass. October 19 attempt failed due to control wiring problem.
Baker	October 28, 1951 15:20:08.9	PST (−8 hrs)	NTS Area 7 37.085°N 116.0209°W	1,280 m (4,200 ft) + 340 m (1,120 ft)	free air drop, weapons development	Mk-4 "LT"	3.5 kt	I-131 venting detected, 600 kCi (22,000 TBq)		No uranium tamper.
Charlie	October 30, 1951 15:00:29.8	PST (−8 hrs)	NTS Area 7 37.085°N 116.0211°W	1,280 m (4,200 ft) + 350 m (1,150 ft)	free air drop, weapons development	Mk-4 "PC"	14 kt	I-131 venting detected, 2 MCi (74 PBq)		
Dog	November 1, 1951 15:30:01.6	PST (−8 hrs)	NTS Area 7 37.0847°N 116.0206°W	1,280 m (4,200 ft) + 430 m (1,410 ft)	free air drop, weapons development	Mk-4 "NF"	21 kt	I-131 venting detected, 3.1 MCi (110 PBq)		Desert Rock I, no fallout (air burst). Troops trucked into defensive emplacements from 6 mi (9.7 km) observation point, held maneuvers.
Easy	November 5, 1951 16:29:58.2	PST (−8 hrs)	NTS Area 7 37.0919°N 116.0253°W	1,280 m (4,200 ft) + 400 m (1,300 ft)	free air drop, weapons development	TX-7E	31 kt	I-131 venting detected, 4.6 MCi (170 PBq)		First test of a tactical nuclear weapon. Air dropped from a B-45 Tornado.
Sugar	November 19, 1951 16:59:59.7	PST (−8 hrs)	NTS Area 9 37.13151°N 116.03947°W	1,280 m (4,200 ft) + 1.1 m (3 ft 7 in)	dry surface, weapon effect	Mk-6 "Johnny"	1.2 kt	I-131 venting detected, 170 kCi (6,300 TBq)		"Surface" shot. Only true surface shot in CONUS history along with Little Feller I & II Desert Rock II; maneuvers conducted at a distance due to dirtiness.
Uncle	November 29, 1951 19:59:59.7	PST (−8 hrs)	NTS Area 10 37.1697°N 116.0434°W	1,283 m (4,209 ft) - 5 m (16 ft)	cratering, weapon effect	Mk-6 "Frankie"	1.2 kt	I-131 venting detected, 170 kCi (6,300 TBq)		Cratering shot, meant to simulate 23 kt ground penetrating weapon. Desert Rock III, observed at 5 mi (8.0 km), kept distance in maneuvers. 5000 R/Hr near GZ one hour after shot.

== Gallery ==
Buster-Jangle Charlie, 14-kilotons.

Buster-Jangle Easy, 31-kilotons.

Buster-Jangle Baker, 3.5-kilotons.

Buster-Jangle Sugar, 1.2-kilotons.
