= Ivy King =

Largest pure-fission US nuclear bomb test

- Ivy King's fireball and subsequent mushroom cloud from sea-level view.

Information
- Country: United States
- Test series: Operation Ivy
- Test site: Enewetak
- Date: November 16, 1952
- Test type: Atmospheric
- Yield: 500 kt (2092 TJ)

Test chronology

Ivy King was the largest fission nuclear weapon to not attempt fusion boosting, yielding 500 kilotons of TNT. It was tested on November 16, 1952, on Enewetak Atoll in the Pacific, by the United States' Truman administration as part of Operation Ivy. Alongside the first multi-megaton thermonuclear test in Ivy Mike, the operation was in response to the nuclear weapons program of the Soviet Union.

The production of Ivy King was hurried to be ready in case its sister project, Ivy Mike, failed to achieve a thermonuclear reaction. Ivy King actually took place two weeks after Mike. Unlike the static experimental setup of the Sausage device in Ivy Mike, the Ivy King device was air-deliverable, and as the Mark 18 nuclear bomb, 90 weapons were produced by the Atomic Energy Commission. The weapons were extremely expensive due to the high mass of highly enriched uranium used in the core.

On November 16, 1952 at 11:30 local time (23:30 GMT) a B-36H bomber dropped the bomb over a point 2,000 feet (610 m) north of Runit Island in the Enewetak atoll, resulting in a 500 kiloton explosion at 1,480 feet (450 m). The tropopause height at the time of the detonation was about 58,000 feet (18 km). The top of the King cloud reached about 75,000 feet (23 km) with the mushroom base at about 40,000 feet (12 km).

The Ivy King bomb, designated as a and named the "Super Oralloy Bomb", was a modified version of the Mk-6D bomb. Instead of using an implosion system similar to the Mk-6D, it used a 92-point implosion system initially developed for the Mk-13. Its uranium-plutonium core was replaced by 60 kg of highly enriched uranium (HEU), similar to the HEU mass in the gun-type Little Boy, but fashioned into a thin-walled sphere equivalent to approximately four critical masses. The thin-walled sphere was a commonly used design, which ensured that the fissile material remained sub-critical until imploded. The HEU sphere was then enclosed in a natural-uranium tamper. To physically prevent the HEU sphere collapsing into a critical condition if the surrounding explosives were detonated accidentally, or if the sphere was crushed following an aircraft accident, the hollow center was filled with a chain made from aluminum and boron, which was pulled out to arm the bomb. The boron-coated chain also absorbed the neutrons needed to drive the nuclear reaction.

The primary designer of the Super Oralloy Bomb, physicist Ted Taylor, later became a vocal proponent of nuclear disarmament.

With an explosive yield of 500 kilotons, Ivy King is the largest fission device ever tested that did not attempt fusion boosting. The Orange Herald nuclear device, a 720-kiloton bomb tested by the United Kingdom on 31 May 1957, attempted to employ fusion boosting with a lithium deuteride component in its core, but its disappointing yield made it unclear if any fusion boosting actually took place. Regardless, Orange Herald was the largest non-Teller-Ulam device ever tested, while Ivy King was the largest nuclear device to lack thermonuclear materials. A related boosting concept, the layer cake design, was tested by the Soviet Union, Britain, and China, achieving its largest yield of 400 kilotons in the RDS-6s test.

== Gallery ==
King test, from aerial view.

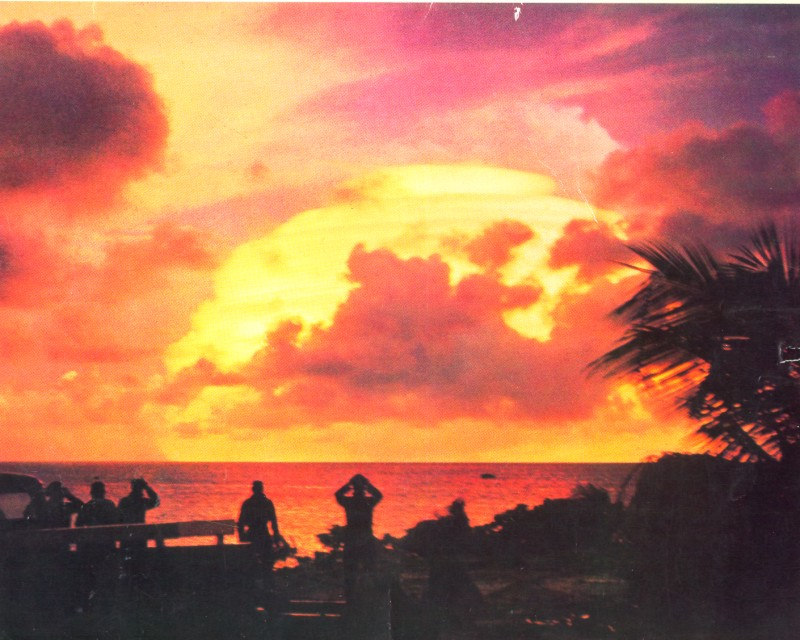
Distant shoreline view.

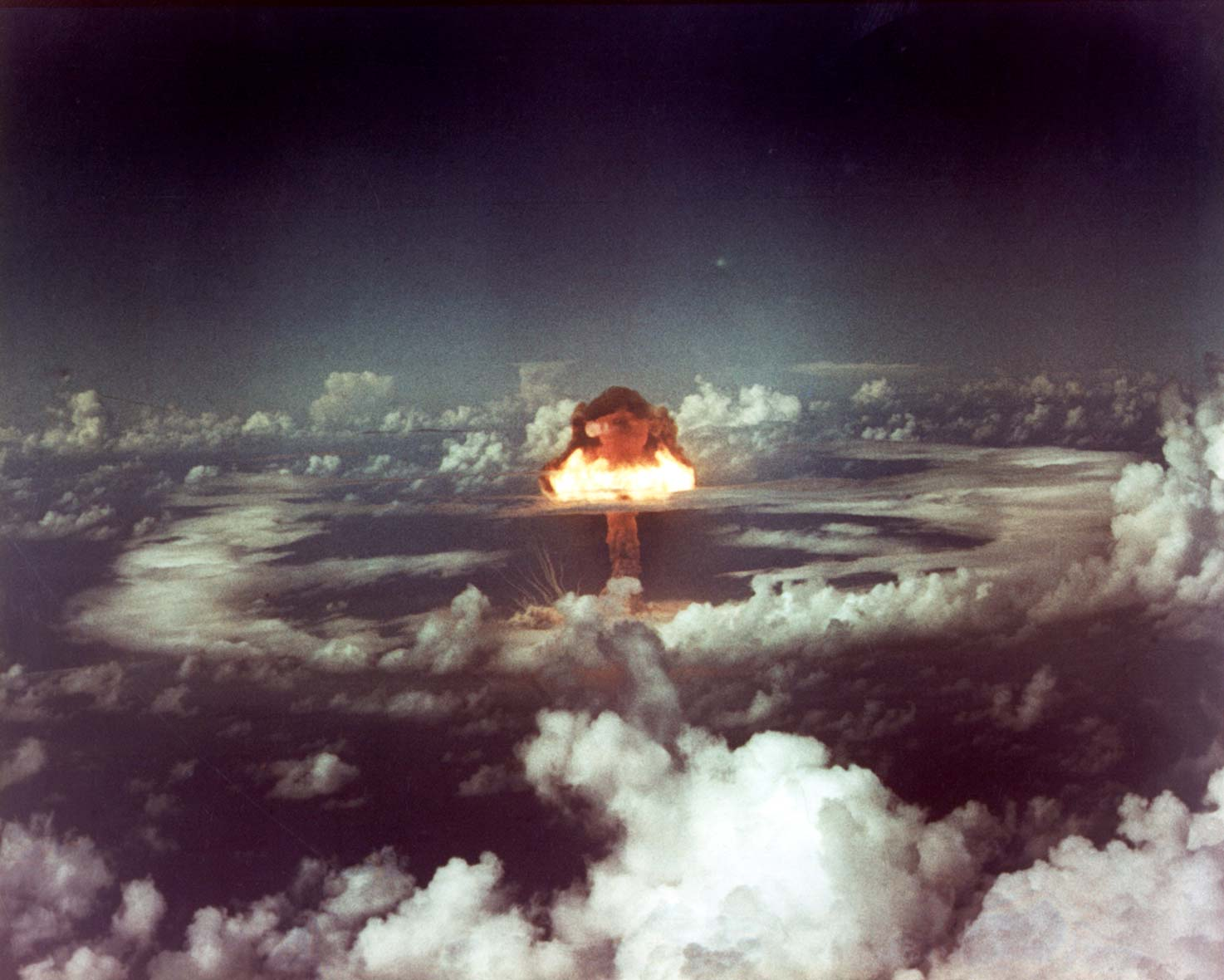

== See also ==
- Orange Herald, largest British single stage nuclear test
- RDS-6s, largest Soviet single stage test
- Project 596L, largest Chinese single stage test
- MR 41, largest French single stage warhead
