= Runit Island =

Island in the Enewetak Atoll, Marshall Islands

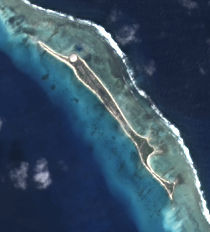
- Satellite view of Runit Island showing the Runit Dome

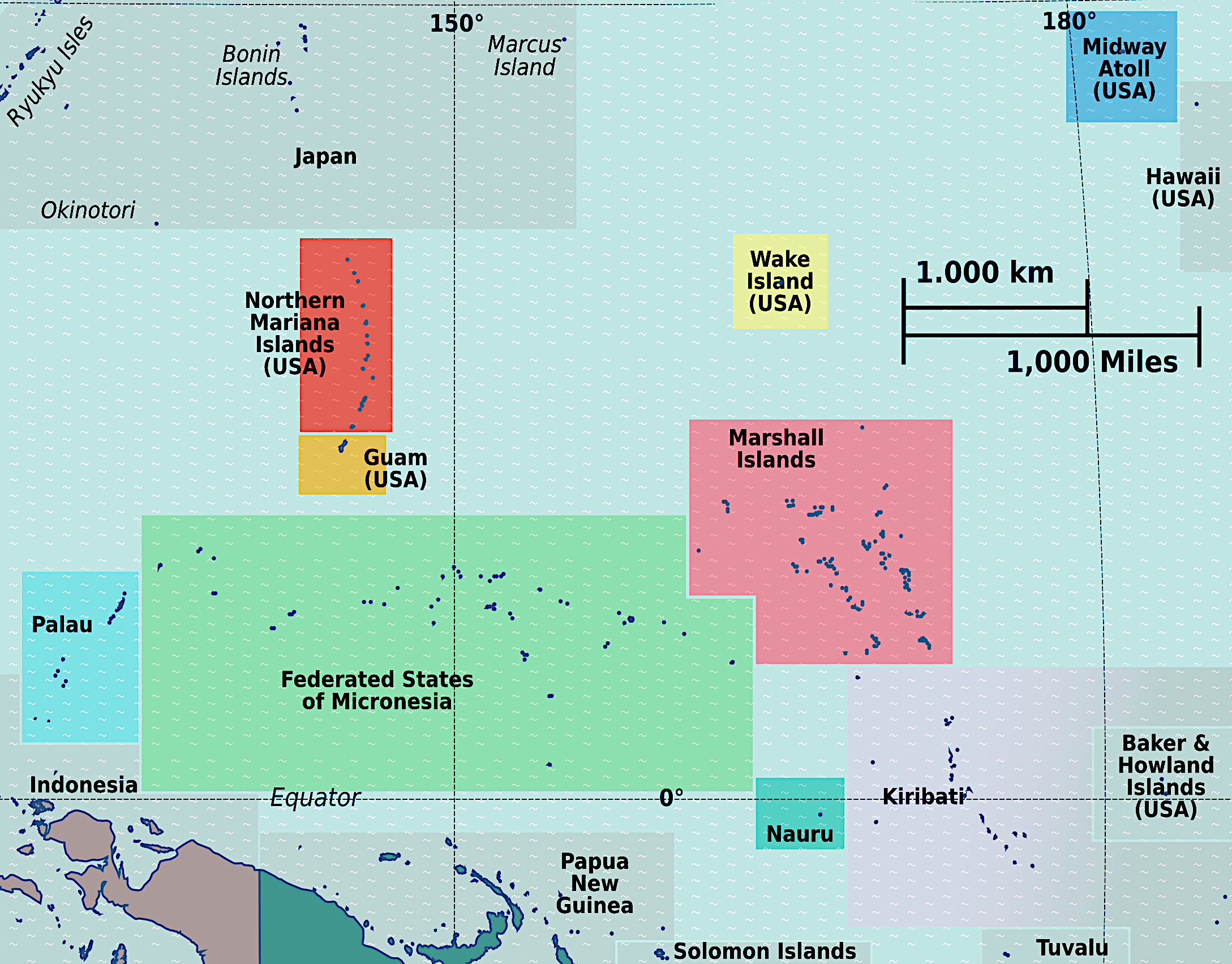
- Location within Marshall Islands Location within Micronesia

Geography
- Location: Pacific Ocean
- Coordinates: 11°32′42″N 162°21′11″E
- Archipelago: Enewetak Atoll
- Total islands: 40

Administration
- Marshall Islands
- Capital city: Majuro

Runit Island (/ˈruːnɪt/) is one of forty islands of the Enewetak Atoll of the Marshall Islands in the Pacific Ocean. The island is the site of a radioactive waste repository left by the United States after it conducted a series of nuclear tests on Enewetak Atoll between 1946 and 1958. There are ongoing concerns around deterioration of the waste site and a potential radioactive spill.

== Runit Dome ==
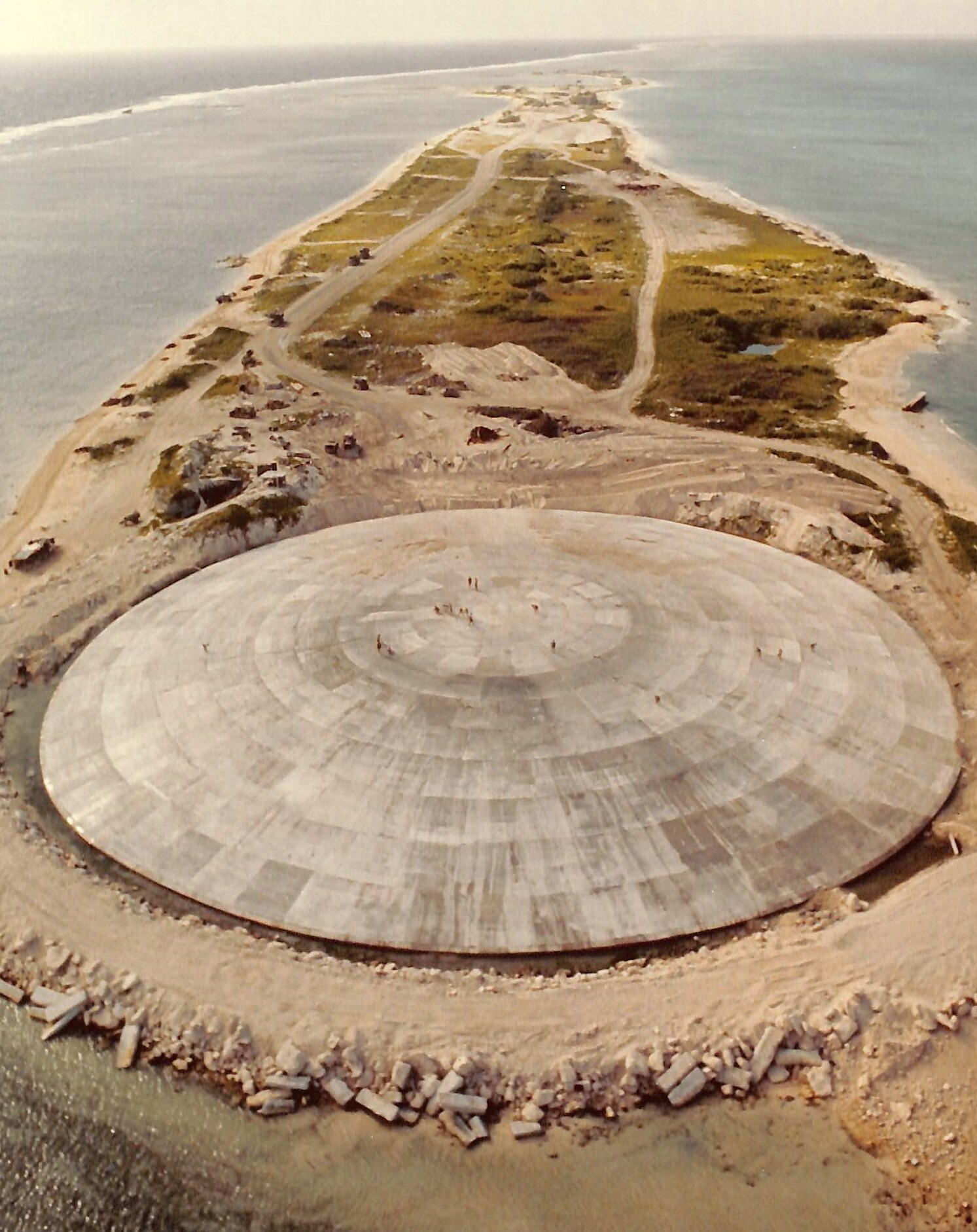
Aerial view of the Runit Dome. The dome is placed in the crater created by the "Cactus" nuclear weapons test in 1958.

=== Construction ===
The Runit Dome, also called Cactus Dome or locally "the Tomb", is a 115-metre (377 ft) diameter, 46-centimetre (18 in) thick dome of concrete at sea level, encapsulating an estimated 73,000 cubic metres (95,000 cu yd) of radioactive debris, including some plutonium-239. The debris stems from nuclear tests conducted in the Enewetak Atoll by the United States between 1946 and 1958.

From 1977 to 1980, loose waste and topsoil from six different islands in the Enewetak Atoll was transported to the site and mixed with concrete to seal the nuclear blast crater created by the Cactus test. Four thousand US servicemen were involved in the cleanup from this test, and it took three years to complete. The waste-filled crater was finally entombed in concrete.

==== Disclosure and accounting ====
U.S. government test records state that during Operation Hardtack I in 1958, over 118 metric tonnes of soil were imported from the Nevada Test Site to Enewetak and placed "in a conical plug beneath the intended burst point" as part of preparations for the Fig nuclear test. Investigative reporting has stated that this transfer was not disclosed to Marshallese representatives during negotiations leading to the 1986 Compact of Free Association.

According to the United States Department of Energy, the Runit containment structure holds approximately 76,000 cubic metres (100,000 cu yd) of radioactively contaminated soil and debris collected during cleanup operations of Enewetak Atoll. The department has not published a complete, independently verified inventory detailing all materials transported to, rehandled at, or ultimately disposed of at the site.

=== Erosion ===
In 1982, a US government task force raised concern about a probable breach if a severe typhoon were to hit the island. In 2013, a report by the US Department of Energy found that the concrete dome had weathered with minor cracking of the structure.

However, the soil around the dome was found to be more contaminated than its contents, so a breach could not increase the radiation levels by any means. Because the cleaning operation in the 1970s only removed an estimated 0.8 percent of the total transuranic waste in the Enewetak atoll, the soil and the lagoon water surrounding the structure now contain a higher level of radioactivity than the debris of the dome itself, so even in the event of a total collapse, the radiation dose delivered to the local resident population or marine environment should not change significantly.

Concern primarily lies in the rapid tidal response to the height of the water beneath the debris pile, with the potential for contamination of the groundwater supply with radionuclides. One particular concern is that, in order to save costs, the original plan to line the porous bottom crater with concrete was abandoned. Since the bottom of the crater consists of permeable soil, there is seawater inside the dome.

However, as the Department of Energy report stated, the released radionuclides will be very rapidly diluted and should not cause any elevated radioactive risk for the marine environment, compared to what is already experienced. Leaking and breaching of the dome could however disperse plutonium, a radioactive element that is also a toxic heavy metal.

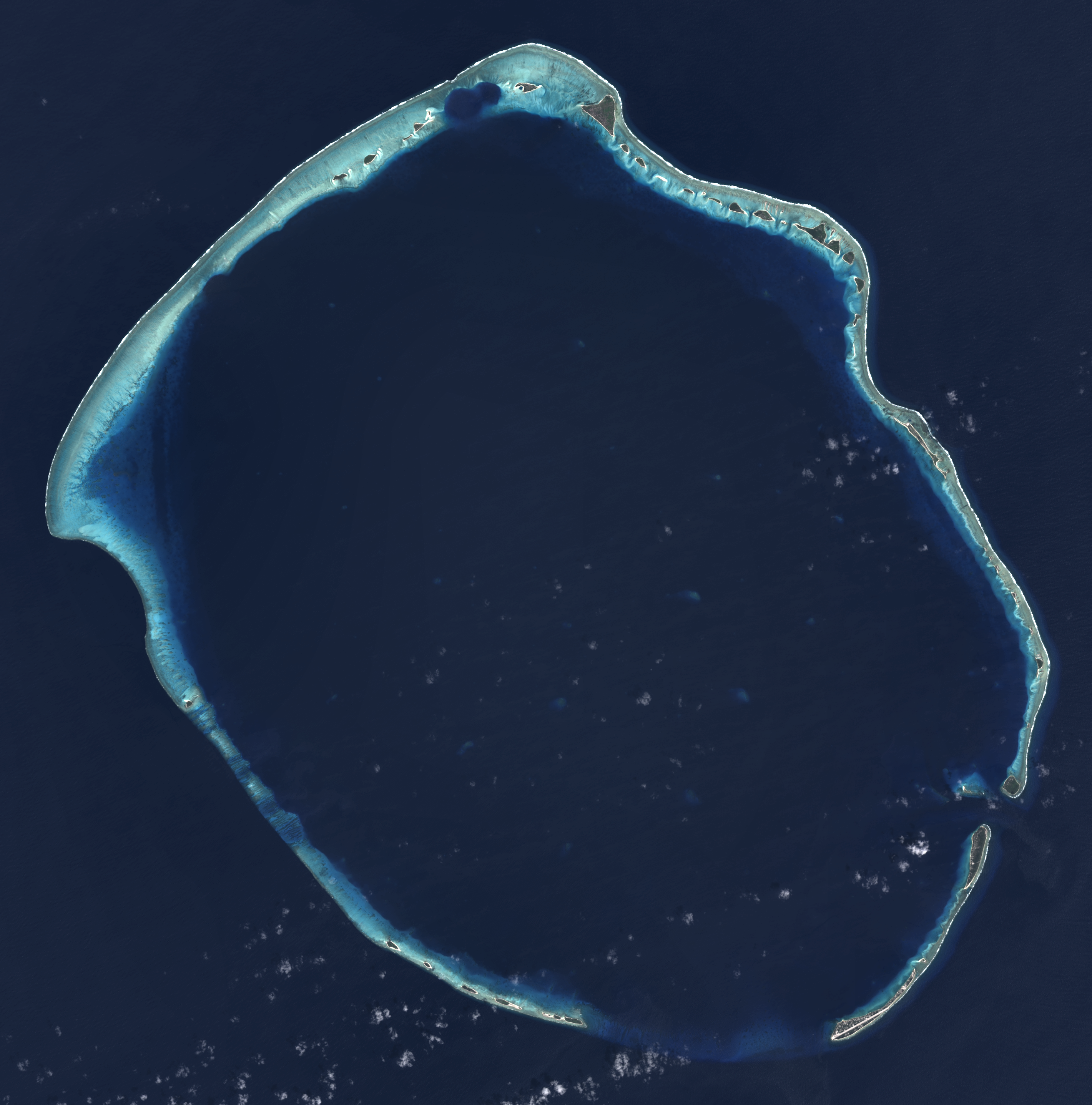

1 / Runit Island

Location within Enewetak Atoll

An investigative report by the Los Angeles Times in November 2019 reignited fears of the dome cracking and releasing radioactive material into the soil and surrounding water. The DOE was directed by Congress to assess the condition of the structure and develop a repair plan during the first half of 2020. The report was published in June 2020.

In June 2020, the US Department of Energy released a report stating that the dome is in no immediate danger of collapse or breach and that the radioactive material within is not expected to have any measurable adverse effect on the surrounding environment for the next twenty years.

== Illness of army personnel ==
Some of the U.S. Army personnel who participated in the dome construction and transport of radioactive materials have claimed that illnesses that developed years later resulted from exposure during the cleanup. Some have died of cancer or developed other serious health problems. The U.S. government has disputed a causal connection between the cleanup work and these illnesses, stating that Enewetak cleanup veterans encountered low levels of radiological contamination and have a low risk of health problems. Under the Honoring our PACT Act of 2022, the Department of Veterans Affairs added participation in the cleanup of Enewetak Atoll from 1 January 1977, through 31 December 1980, to the list of radiation-risk activities for which exposure is presumed for certain disability claims.

== See also ==
- Operation Ivy
- Ivy Mike Nuclear Test
- Ivy King Nuclear Test

== Gallery ==
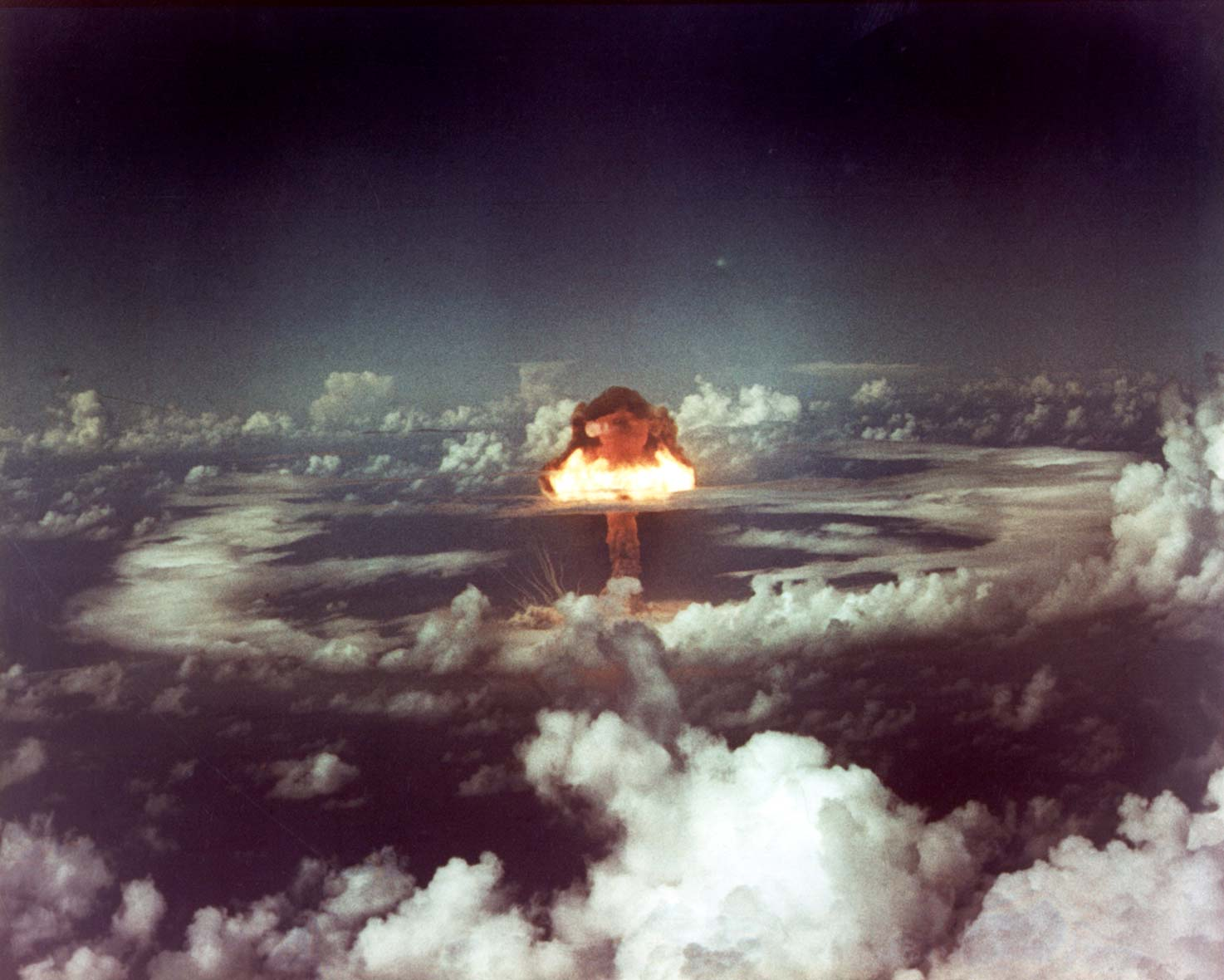
In 1952, the United States dropped the nuclear bomb Ivy King 610 m (2,000 feet) north of Runit Island.

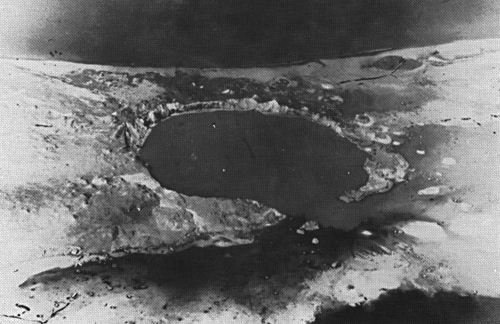
Crater created by detonation on 5 May 1958 (Operation Hardtack I, Cactus test)
