= Mark 18 nuclear bomb =

American nuclear bomb design

The Mark 18 nuclear bomb, also known as the SOB or Super Oralloy Bomb, was an American nuclear bomb design which was the highest yield fission bomb produced by the US. The Mark 18 had a design yield of 500 kilotons. Nuclear weapon designer Ted Taylor was the lead designer for the Mark 18.

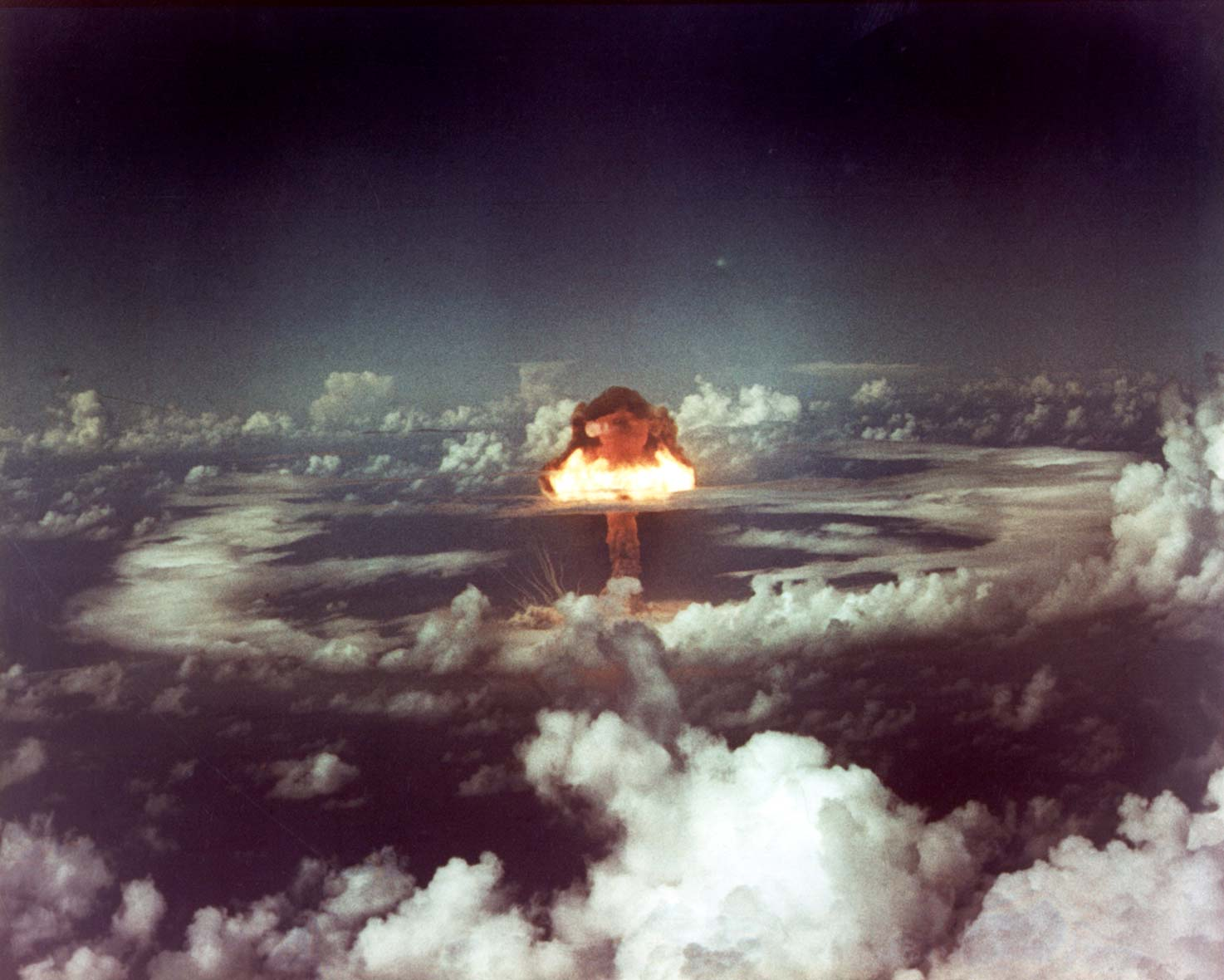
The Ivy King test firing of the Mark 18 SOB design

The Mark 18 was tested once, in the Ivy King nuclear test at the Enewetak atoll in the Pacific Ocean on November 16 1952. The test was a complete success at full yield.

== Description ==
The Mark 18 bomb design used an advanced 92-point implosion system, derived from the Mark 13 nuclear bomb and its ancestors the Mark 6 nuclear bomb, Mark 4 nuclear bomb, and Fat Man Mark 3 nuclear bomb of World War II. Its normal mixed uranium/plutonium fissile core ("pit") was replaced with over 60 kg of pure highly enriched uranium or HEU. With a natural uranium tamper layer, the bomb had over four critical masses of fissile material in the core, and was unsafe: the accidental detonation of even one of the detonator triggers would likely have caused a significant (many kilotons of energy yield) explosion. An aluminum/boron chain designed to absorb neutrons was placed in the fissile pit to reduce the risk of accidental high yield detonation, and removed during the last steps of the arming sequence.

== Deployment ==
Beginning in March 1953, the United States deployed a number of Mark 18 bombs. A total of 90 were manufactured and placed in service.

The weapon had a short lifetime, and was replaced by thermonuclear weapons in the mid-1950s. The Mark 18 weapons were all modified into lower yield Mark 6 nuclear bomb variants in 1956.

== See also ==
- List of nuclear weapons
- Ivy King
- Nuclear weapon design
- Mark 13 nuclear bomb
- Mark 6 nuclear bomb
- Mark 4 nuclear bomb
- Fat Man Mark 3 nuclear bomb
- Orange Herald
