= Orange Herald =

British nuclear weapon

Orange Herald fireball and subsequent mushroom cloud, film reel captured from a trailing aircraft

Orange Herald was a British nuclear weapon, tested on 31 May 1957. It used 117 kg of highly enriched uranium, more than any other nuclear weapon built or tested, and yielded 720 kilotons. It was intended as a boosted fission weapon, using a small quantity of lithium deuteride and tritide in the core, but it is thought this contributed either nothing or a very small fraction to the yield. This would make it either the largest ever pure fission weapon, exceeding the US Ivy King test, or the largest boosted fission weapon.

== Technical ==
Orange Herald was a fusion boosted British fission nuclear weapon (called a core-boosted device by the British), comprising a U-235 core containing a small amount of lithium deuteride (LiD). 'Herald' was suitable for mounting on a missile, utilizing 117 kg of U-235. However, Britain's annual production of U-235 was only 120 kg at this time, which would have made such weapons rare and very expensive.

Two versions were designed - an "Orange Herald Large" with an overall diameter of 39 inches (1.0 m), and an "Orange Herald Small" with overall diameter of 30 inches (0.75 m). The difference between the two was in the size of the high explosives; the fissile cores were similar. Orange Herald Small was intended as a warhead for a ballistic missile. Orange Herald Large was designed as a device which would have the most certainty to give a yield in the megaton range. However, due to its size it was not suited as a warhead for the ballistic missile and was more of an insurance which could be used if other devices failed to achieve the desired yield.

The Orange Herald Small version was tested once, yielding 720 kt of explosive power on 31 May 1957, during the Grapple 2/Orange Herald tests on Malden Island in the Pacific. Orange Herald remains the largest fission device ever tested.

It is thought that the fusion boosting failed to increase the yield. A higher compression but smaller fission pit American weapon, the Mark 18 Super Oralloy Bomb, had a yield of 500 kilotons from a pit with slightly over 60 kilograms of highly enriched uranium, around 8 kilotons per kilogram of uranium, about the practical maximum 50% fission yield efficiency for very large or very highly boosted fission weapons. Even with less compression, the larger 117 kg pit of HEU in the Orange Herald Small should have had a roughly similar efficiency, but the observed 720 kiloton yield equals only just over 6 kilotons per kilogram of uranium.

Orange Herald was the first British nuclear device to use an external neutron source.

== History ==
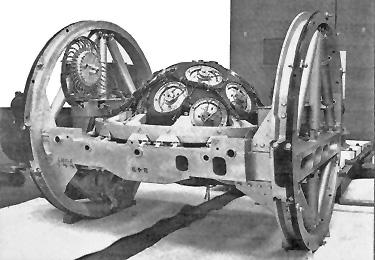
The Orange Herald (small) device, proof-tested in 1957 with an explosive yield of 720 kilotons

Britain rushed the development of these predicted-megaton class weapons because in 1955 it seemed that atmospheric testing could soon be outlawed by treaty. As a result, the UK wanted to demonstrate its ability to manufacture megaton class weapons by proof-testing them before any legal prohibitions were in place. According to an article in New Scientist, Prime Minister Harold Macmillan was also hoping to convince the US to change the McMahon Act, which prohibited sharing information even with the British, by demonstrating that the UK had the technology to make a thermonuclear weapon (an H-bomb), and he put William Penney, a British professor who had worked in the Manhattan Project, in charge of developing this bomb. In this the test of the Orange Herald was successful.

It is believed by some that the large requirements of tritium that Orange Herald needed (actually it contained only a small amount of thermonuclear material) was a major cause of the Windscale fire. It was unpopular with the scientists who worked on the project. One of the workers in the British nuclear program, Dr. Bryan Taylor, is quoted as saying "I thought that Orange Herald was a stupid device. It wasn't elegant, it couldn't be developed any further, it was a dead end design. And it consumed an enormous amount of very expensive fissile material". This is the thesis of a BBC documentary on the topic of the fire, Windscale: Britain’s Biggest Nuclear Disaster.

== See also ==
- Rainbow Code
- Windscale fire
- Mark 18 nuclear bomb
- Ivy King
- MR 41
