= Mark 13 nuclear bomb =

Experimental nuclear weapon

- Type: Fission bomb / Nuclear warhead
- Place of origin: United States

Service history
- In service: Never entered operational service (cancelled during development)

Production history
- Designer: Los Alamos National Laboratory
- Designed: 1951–1953
- No. built: Experimental prototypes only
- Variants: W-13 (Missile/Cruise warhead); Mark 18 (Super Oralloy Bomb); Mark 20

Specifications
- Mass: Mark 13 bomb: 7,400 lb (3,300 kg); W-13 warhead: 6,000–6,500 lb (2,700–2,900 kg)
- Length: Mark 13 bomb: 128 in (320 cm); W-13 warhead: 100 in (250 cm)
- Diameter: Mark 13 bomb: 61 in (150 cm); W-13 warhead: 58 in (145 cm)

The Mark 13 nuclear bomb and its variant, the W-13 nuclear warhead for Redstone ballistic missile and Snark cruise missile, were experimental nuclear weapons developed by the United States from 1951 to 1954. The Mark 13 design was based on the earlier Mark 6 nuclear bomb design, which was in turn based on the Mark 4 nuclear bomb and the Mark 3 nuclear bomb used at the end of World War II.

== Description ==
The Mark 13 bomb was nearly the same size as the Mark 6 nuclear bomb it was developed from; 61 inches in diameter and 128 inches long (150 cm by 320 cm), weighing 7,400 lb (3,300 kg). The W-13 warhead was somewhat smaller, being roughly 58 inches in diameter and 100 inches long, with a 6,000 to 6,500 lb weight (145 cm by 250 cm, 2,700 kg to 2,900 kg).

The Mark 13 design used a 92-point nuclear implosion system (see Nuclear weapon design). A similar 92-point system was used in later variants of the Mark 6 weapon.

== Testing ==
The Mark 13 nuclear bomb design was tested at least once, in the Operation Upshot–Knothole Harry test shot conducted on May 19, 1953. The estimated yield of this test was 32 kilotons.

== Deployment ==
As the Mark 13 neared production, advances in thermonuclear weapon design, particularly the Ivy Mike thermonuclear test in November 1952, made the Mark 13 obsolete. Development continued for research purposes (the Upshot-Knothole Harry test shot came months after the first thermonuclear test in Ivy Mike), and in two variant designs, but the Mark 13 proper was never deployed. The Mark 13 bomb version was canceled in August 1953, and the W-13 warhead version was cancelled in September 1953.

== Variants ==
=== Mark 18 ===
The Mark 18 nuclear bomb also known as the Super Oralloy Bomb (or its initials SOB) utilized the 92-point Mark 13 implosion system, but a different fissile core with around 60 kilograms of highly enriched uranium (Oralloy). This was the largest pure fission nuclear bomb ever tested, with a yield of more than 500 kilotons. The Mark 18 was produced in moderate quantities (90 units) and in service from 1953 to 1956.

=== Mark 20 ===
The Mark 20 nuclear bomb was a planned successor to the Mark 13 incorporating some improvements in its design. Research was halted at the same time as the Mark 13.

The Mark 20 was the same size as the Mark 13, but weighed only 6,400 lb (2,900 kg).

== See also ==
- List of nuclear weapons
- Mark 18 nuclear bomb
- Mark 6 nuclear bomb
- Mark 4 nuclear bomb
- Fat Man Mark 3 nuclear bomb
