= Operation Tumbler–Snapper =

Series of 1950s US nuclear tests

- Tumbler-Snapper Dog, 19 kilotons

Information
- Country: United States
- Test site: NTS Areas 5, 11, Frenchman Flat; NTS, Areas 1–4, 6–10, Yucca Flat
- Period: 1952
- Number of tests: 8
- Test type: free air drop, tower
- Max. yield: 31 kilotonnes of TNT (130 TJ)

Test series chronology

Operation Tumbler–Snapper was a series of nuclear weapons tests conducted by the United States from April through June, 1952 at the Nevada Proving Ground, northwest of Las Vegas. They followed Operation Buster–Jangle and preceded Operation Ivy.

There were two principal test groups at TUMBLER-SNAPPER. The Military Effects Test Group (METG) was sponsored by the Department of Defense, Test Command, Armed Forces Special Weapons Project (AFSWP). The Weapons Development Test Group (WDTG) was sponsored by the Atomic Energy Commission. The METG involved more Department of Defense (DOD) participants while the WDTG was conducted principally by the Los Alamos Scientific Laboratory with the occasional involvement of DOD personnel.

Operation TUMBLER was principally focused on weapons effects tests and included Shots ABLE, BAKER, CHARLIE, and DOG. These were airdrops intended to help explain discrepancies in the actual and estimated blast shock wave damage noted on previous detonations and to establish more accurately the optimal height of burst.

Operation SNAPPER was intended to study nuclear phenomena in order to improve nuclear weapon design. The phase included two airdrop tests which were included in Operation TUMBLER – shots CHARLIE and DOG – and four tower detonations – shots EASY, FOX, GEORGE, and HOW.

The military exercise Desert Rock IV, involving 7350 soldiers, took place during the test series. They trained during the Charlie, Dog, and George shots and observed shot Fox.

In the official reports on the tests, the term height refers to the distance of the detonation above ground level, while altitude denotes elevation relative to mean sea level. At the test site, Yucca Flat lies at an elevation of approximately 4,000 feet (1,200 m) above mean sea level, and Frenchman Flat at about 3,000 feet (900 m). All detonation times are given in Pacific Standard Time (PST), with corresponding Coordinated Universal Time (UTC) values.

== Tests ==
=== Shot ABLE ===
Shot ABLE was detonated on April 1, 1952 at 09:00 Pacific Standard Time (17:00 UTC) as a 1-kiloton device released from an aircraft and burst at an altitude of approximately 793 feet over Area 5 of Frenchman Flat. The detonation was part of the TUMBLER phase of the series, which examined the effects of burst height on blast characteristics in low-yield airbursts.

==== Units and organisations involved ====
- Military Effects Test Group
- Weapons Development Test Group
- Armed Forces Special Weapons Center (AFSWC)
- Strategic Air Command (SAC), including over 150 personnel observing from B-50 aircraft
- Camp Desert Rock support personnel (limited observer presence)

==== Results ====
Approximately 30 experiments were conducted to obtain data on weapons effects. AFSWC aircraft carried out the delivery of the device and supported follow-up operations, including aerial tracking of the cloud, sampling, and survey missions. No Exercise Desert Rock IV troop maneuver or observer program was conducted for this shot. Radiological surveys conducted several hours after the detonation indicated that the 0.01 R/h radiation level extended to a distance of about 600 metres from ground zero.

=== Shot BAKER ===
Shot BAKER was detonated on April 15, 1952 at 09:30 Pacific Standard Time (17:30 UTC) as a 1-kiloton device released from an aircraft and burst at an altitude of approximately 1,109 feet over Area 7 of Yucca Flat. The test formed part of the TUMBLER phase and contributed additional data on how burst height influenced blast overpressure and related effects.

==== Units and organisations involved ====
- Military Effects Test Group
- Weapons Development Test Group
- Armed Forces Special Weapons Center (AFSWC)
- Strategic Air Command (SAC), including personnel observing from B-50 aircraft
- Camp Desert Rock support personnel (small observer presence)

==== Results ====
Approximately 45 experiments were conducted to support weapons-effects analysis. Aircraft from AFSWC carried out the delivery of the device and subsequent aerial operations, including tracking and survey activities. No Exercise Desert Rock IV troop maneuver or observer programme accompanied this detonation. Initial radiological measurements indicated levels of about 1.2 R/h at ground zero approximately one hour after the burst, decreasing to around 0.01 R/h at a distance of about 750 meters to the south.

=== Shot CHARLIE ===
Shot CHARLIE was detonated on April 22, 1952 at 09:30 Pacific Standard Time (17:30 UTC) as a 31-kiloton device released from an aircraft and detonated at an altitude of approximately 3,447 feet over Area 7 of Yucca Flat. The test served both the TUMBLER weapons-effects program and the SNAPPER phase objectives related to weapon development.

CHARLIE was the first major event associated with Exercise Desert Rock IV, incorporating both a troop observer program and tactical maneuvers. The observer component involved approximately 535 personnel, while the maneuvers included about 1,675 troops participating in field exercises following the detonation.

=== Shot DOG ===
Shot DOG was originally scheduled for April 29, 1952, but was postponed due to adverse weather conditions. The detonation took place on May 1, 1952, at 08:30 Pacific Standard Time (16:30 UTC) as a 19-kiloton device released from an aircraft and burst at an altitude of approximately 1,040 feet over Area 7 of Yucca Flat.

Although Pacific Daylight Time had come into effect on April 27, 1952, official reports for the series continued to use Pacific Standard Time to maintain consistency across test documentation.

The shot formed part of Exercise Desert Rock IV activities and involved U.S. Navy and Marine Corps personnel in both observer programs and tactical maneuvers conducted in conjunction with the detonation.

=== Shot EASY ===
Shot EASY was originally scheduled for May 6, 1952, but was conducted on May 7, 1952, at 04:15 Pacific Standard Time (12:15 UTC). The device, with a yield of approximately 12 kilotons, was detonated from a 300-foot tower in Area 1 of Yucca Flat.

No formal Exercise Desert Rock IV troop maneuver or observer program accompanied this test. However, approximately 1,000 Camp Desert Rock support personnel witnessed the detonation from the Control Point at Yucca Pass.

=== Shot FOX ===
Shot FOX was originally scheduled for May 13, 1952, but was postponed and ultimately detonated on May 25, 1952, at 04:00 Pacific Standard Time (12:00 UTC). The device, with a yield of approximately 11 kilotons, was detonated from a 300-foot tower in Area 4 of Yucca Flat.

The shot formed part of Exercise Desert Rock IV and included troop observer activities involving U.S. Army units as well as personnel from continental Army commands and service schools. Department of Defense personnel participated in multiple test-group experiments, while aircraft from the Armed Forces Special Weapons Center (AFSWC) provided operational support. Approximately 100 Strategic Air Command (SAC) personnel observed the detonation from aircraft operating in the vicinity of the Nevada Proving Ground.

=== Shot GEORGE ===
Shot GEORGE was originally scheduled for May 20, 1952, but was postponed until June 1, 1952. The 15-kiloton device was detonated at 03:55 Pacific Standard Time (11:55 UTC) from a 300-foot tower in Area 3 of Yucca Flat.

The shot constituted a major Exercise Desert Rock IV event, incorporating both a troop observer program and tactical maneuvers involving approximately 1,800 U.S. Army personnel. Department of Defense participants took part in roughly 25 experimental projects associated with the test. Aircraft from the Armed Forces Special Weapons Center (AFSWC) provided operational support, while 24 Strategic Air Command (SAC) observers monitored the detonation from two B-50 aircraft.

=== Shot HOW ===
Shot HOW was the final detonation of the series. Originally scheduled for May 27, 1952, it was carried out on June 5, 1952, at 03:55 Pacific Standard Time (11:55 UTC). The device, with a yield of approximately 14 kilotons, was detonated from a 300-foot tower in Area 2 of Yucca Flat.

No Exercise Desert Rock IV troop maneuver or observer program was conducted for this shot. Department of Defense personnel participated in a number of test-group experiments, with AFSWC aircraft providing air support. Strategic Air Command (SAC) observers monitored the detonation from aircraft operating in the vicinity of the test site.

== Aftermath ==
The Tumbler-Snapper detonations included some particularly fallout-heavy weapons. Of particular note is shot George, which contaminated more citizens than any other nuclear test in the United States. George alone accounted for some 7 percent of all population exposure to radiation during the 1,032 nuclear tests performed by the United States.

The ten highest radiation exposures to residents from US continental nuclear testing, with shot George in the first column.

== Summary ==
United States' Tumbler–Snapper series tests and detonations
Name (Note: The US, France and Great Britain have code-named their test events, while the USSR and China did not, and therefore have only test numbers (with some exceptions – Soviet peaceful explosions were named). Word translations into English in parentheses unless the name is a proper noun. A dash followed by a number indicates a member of a salvo event. The US also sometimes named the individual explosions in such a salvo test, which results in "name1 – 1(with name2)". If test is canceled or aborted, then the row data like date and location discloses the intended plans, where known.)	Date time (UT)	Local time zone (Note: To convert the UT time into standard local, add the number of hours in parentheses to the UT time; for local daylight saving time, add one additional hour. If the result is earlier than 00:00, add 24 hours and subtract 1 from the day; if it is 24:00 or later, subtract 24 hours and add 1 to the day. Historical time zone data obtained from the IANA time zone database.)	Location (Note: Rough place name and a latitude/longitude reference; for rocket-carried tests, the launch location is specified before the detonation location, if known. Some locations are extremely accurate; others (like airdrops and space blasts) may be quite inaccurate. "~" indicates a likely pro-forma rough location, shared with other tests in that same area.)	Elevation + height (Note: Elevation is the ground level at the point directly below the explosion relative to sea level; height is the additional distance added or subtracted by tower, balloon, shaft, tunnel, air drop or other contrivance. For rocket bursts the ground level is "N/A". In some cases it is not clear if the height is absolute or relative to ground, for example, Plumbbob/John. No number or units indicates the value is unknown, while "0" means zero. Sorting on this column is by elevation and height added together.)	Delivery, (Note: Atmospheric, airdrop, balloon, gun, cruise missile, rocket, surface, tower, and barge are all disallowed by the Partial Nuclear Test Ban Treaty. Sealed shaft and tunnel are underground, and remained useful under the PTBT. Intentional cratering tests are borderline; they occurred under the treaty, were sometimes protested, and generally overlooked if the test was declared to be a peaceful use.) Purpose (Note: Include weapons development, weapon effects, safety test, transport safety test, war, science, joint verification and industrial/peaceful, which may be further broken down.)	Device (Note: Designations for test items where known, "?" indicates some uncertainty about the preceding value, nicknames for particular devices in quotes. This category of information is often not officially disclosed.)	Yield (Note: Estimated energy yield in tons, kilotons, and megatons. A ton of TNT equivalent is defined as 4.184 gigajoules (1 gigacalorie).)	Fallout (Note: Radioactive emission to the atmosphere aside from prompt neutrons, where known. The measured species is only iodine-131 if mentioned, otherwise it is all species. No entry means unknown, probably none if underground and "all" if not; otherwise notation for whether measured on the site only or off the site, where known, and the measured amount of radioactivity released.)	References	Notes
Able	April 1, 1952 17:00:07.5	PST (−8 h)	NTS Area 5 36.7983°N 115.9364°W	940 m (3,080 ft) + 240 m (790 ft)	free air drop, weapon effect	Mk-4	1 kt	iodine-131 venting detected, 140 kCi (5,200 TBq)		U-235 core, same as Ranger Able. Same scale height as Hiroshima and Buster Baker in order to recreate similar blast conditions on a different type of surface.
Baker	April 15, 1952 17:29:57.1	PST (−8 h)	NTS Area 7 37.0841°N 116.0203°W	1,280 m (4,200 ft) + 340 m (1,120 ft)	free air drop, weapon effect	Mk-4	1 kt	iodine-131 venting detected, 140 kCi (5,200 TBq)		Repeat of Tumbler Able but on the Buster area at a higher height of burst.
Charlie	April 22, 1952 17:30:10.0	PST (−8 h)	NTS Area 7 37.0844°N 116.0211°W	1,280 m (4,200 ft) + 1,050 m (3,440 ft)	free air drop, weapon effect, weapons development	Mk-4	31 kt	iodine-131 venting detected, 4.6 MCi (170 PBq)		Same scale height as Tumbler Baker in order to check the applicability of cube root blast scaling. Proof test of new core (?). First blast broadcast live on TV. Desert Rock IV.
Dog	May 1, 1952 16:29:59.1	PST (−8 h)	NTS Area 7 37.0841°N 116.0211°W	1,280 m (4,200 ft) + 320 m (1,050 ft)	free air drop, weapon effect, weapons development	TX-7	19 kt	iodine-131 venting detected, 2.9 MCi (110 PBq)		Same scale height as Buster Charlie and Easy. First boosted fission test in CONUS. Tested deuterium (without tritium) gas fusion boosting. First detection of a precursor pressure wave. Desert Rock IV.
Easy	May 7, 1952 12:14:59.3	PST (−8 h)	NTS Area 1 37.053°N 116.1064°W	1,294 m (4,245 ft) + 90 m (300 ft)	tower, weapons development	Mk-12 "BROK-1"	12 kt	iodine-131 venting detected, 1.8 MCi (67 PBq)		First use of beryllium as tamper.
Fox	May 25, 1952 11:59:59.6	PST (−8 h)	NTS Area 4 37.0955°N 116.1064°W	1,300 m (4,300 ft) + 90 m (300 ft)	tower, weapons development	TX-5 "XR1"	11 kt	iodine-131 venting detected, 1.6 MCi (59 PBq)		Designed to test the initiation/yield curve. Calibration test for TOM polonium/beryllium internal initiator. Desert Rock IV.
George	June 1, 1952 11:54:59.8	PST (−8 h)	NTS Area 3 37.048°N 116.022°W	1,229 m (4,032 ft) + 90 m (300 ft)	tower, weapons development	TX-5 "XR-2"	15 kt	iodine-131 venting detected, 2.2 MCi (81 PBq)		Tested an external betatron initiator that shot x-rays into the core, which induced neutrons by photofission. Desert Rock IV.
How	June 5, 1952 11:55:00.3	PST (−8 h)	NTS Area 2 37.1386°N 116.1187°W	1,370 m (4,490 ft) + 90 m (300 ft)	tower, weapons development	TX-12 "Scorpion"	14 kt	iodine-131 venting detected, 2.1 MCi (78 PBq)		First test to use a beryllium neutron reflector/tamper.

== Video ==
A photographic-study of blast and thermal phenomena - Operation TUMBLER.

== Gallery ==
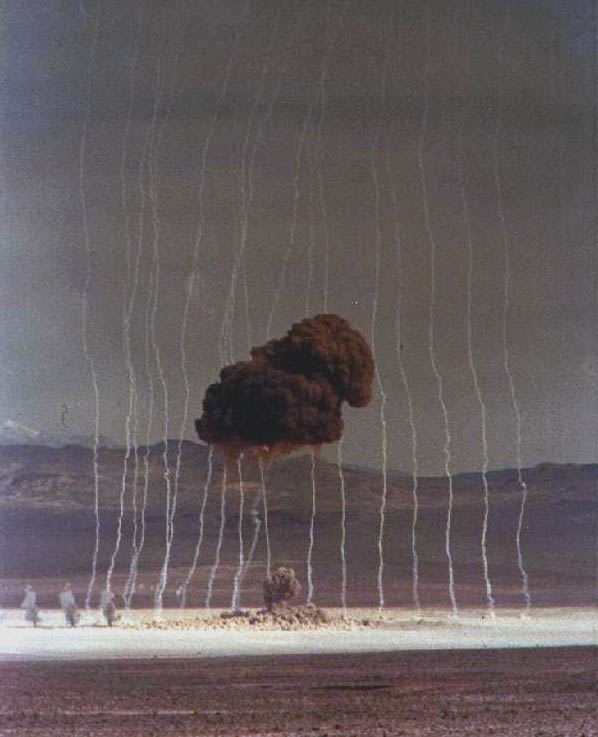
Tumbler-Snapper Able, 1-kiloton.

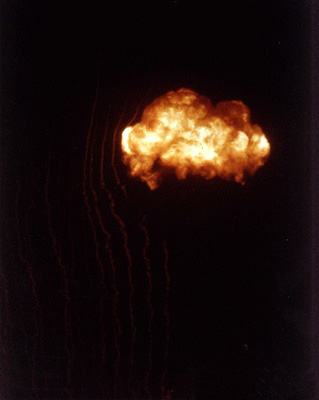
Tumbler-Snapper Charlie, 31-kilotons.

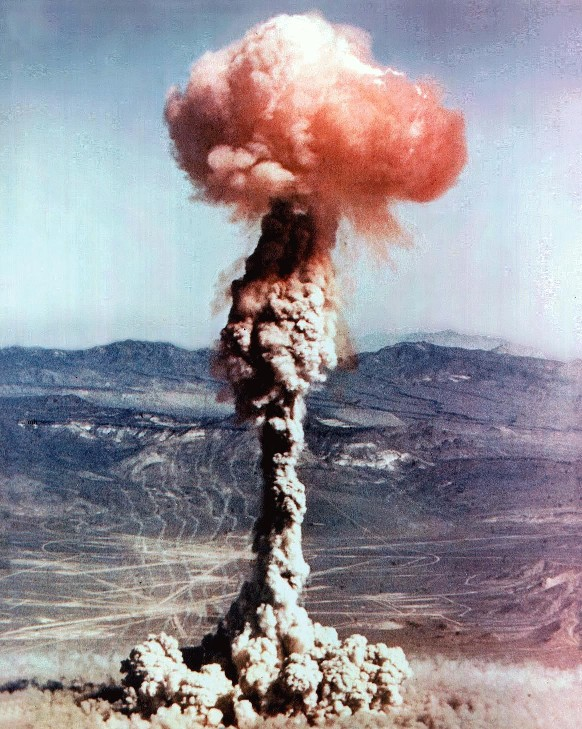
Tumbler-Snapper Dog, 19-kilotons.

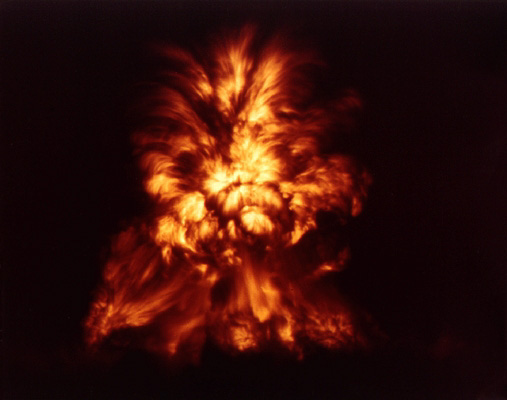
Tumbler-Snapper Fox, 11-kilotons.

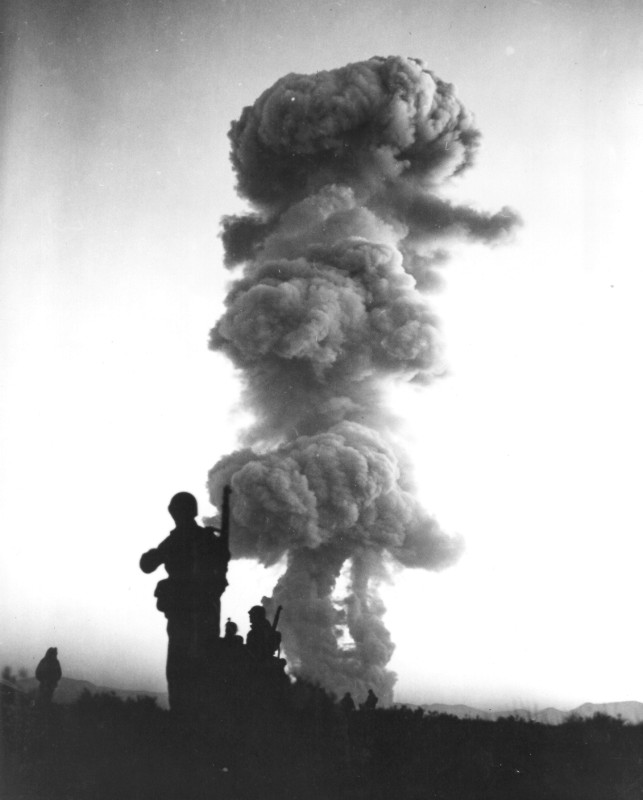
Tumbler-Snapper George, 15-kilotons.

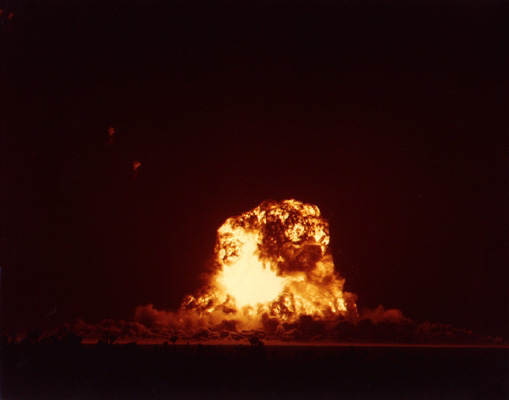
Tumbler-Snapper How, 14-kilotons.
