= Operation Ivy =

Series of 1950s US nuclear tests

- Operation Ivy test detonations of Mike (top) and King (bottom), sped up

Information
- Country: United States
- Test site: Elugelab (Flora), Enewetak Atoll; Runit (Yvonne), Enewetak Atoll
- Period: 1952
- Number of tests: 2
- Test type: dry surface, free air drop
- Max. yield: 10.4 megatonnes of TNT (44 PJ)

Test series chronology

Operation Ivy was the eighth series of American nuclear tests, coming after Tumbler-Snapper and before Upshot–Knothole. The two explosions were staged in late 1952 at Enewetak Atoll in the Pacific Proving Ground in the Marshall Islands.

== Background ==
On January 31, 1950, President Harry S. Truman ordered that the US should continue research into all forms of nuclear weapons, including the development of thermonuclear weapons. The Operation Ivy test series was the first to involve a hydrogen bomb rather than an atomic bomb, and was a key step towards Truman's goal. The bombs were prepared by the US Atomic Energy Commission and Department of Defense aboard naval vessels and were capable of being detonated remotely from the control ship USS Estes.

On August 13, 1952, Operation Texan, a full-scale rehearsal of Operation Ivy, was conducted at Bergstrom AFB, Texas. The rehearsal allowed crews of effects aircraft, drop aircraft, samplers, sampler controllers, and tankers to practice mission and communications procedures.

== Tests ==
=== Mike ===
The first Ivy shot, codenamed Mike, was the first successful full-scale test of a multi-megaton thermonuclear weapon ("hydrogen bomb") using the Teller-Ulam design. Unlike later thermonuclear weapons, Mike used deuterium as its fusion fuel, maintained as a liquid by an expensive and cumbersome cryogenic system. The bomb was detonated on November 1, 1952, on Elugelab Island yielding 10.4 megatons, almost 500 times the yield of the bomb dropped on Nagasaki, resulting in the total vaporization of the island. Eight megatons of the yield were from fast fission of the uranium tamper, creating massive amounts of radioactive fallout. The detonation left an underwater crater 6,240 ft (1.9 km) wide and 164 ft (50 m) deep where Elugelab Island had been. Following this successful test, the Mike design was weaponized as the EC-16, but it was quickly abandoned for solid-fueled designs after the success of the Castle Bravo shot two years later.

The outcome of the test was reported to incoming president Eisenhower by Atomic Energy Commission Chairman, Gordon Dean, as follows: “The island of Elugelab is missing!”

==== Sampling mission ====
Four USAF F-84G Thunderjets equipped with filters were flown through the mushroom cloud's stem to collect radiochemical samples for analysis. "Red Flight" Leader Virgil K. Meroney of the nascent 1211th Test Squadron flew into the stem of the explosion first. In five minutes, he had gathered all the samples he could, and exited. Jimmy Priestly Robinson, age 28, a captain with the 561st Fighter-Day Squadron, was lost near the end of his mission. After re-emerging from the cloud, both he and his wingman, pilot Captain Bob Hagan, encountered difficulties picking up rendezvous and runway navigational beacons due to "electromagnetic after effects" of the detonation. Robinson hit an area of severe turbulence, entering a spin and barely retaining consciousness. He regained control of his plane at 20,000 feet, but the electromagnetic storm had disrupted his instruments. In rain and poor visibility, without working instruments, Hagan and Robinson were unable to find the KB-29 tanker aircraft to refuel. By the time they were successful in finding the signal, they were dangerously low on fuel, and before reaching the runway on Enewetak, both had depleted their reserves. Hagan made a successful dead-stick landing on the runway, but Robinson was too far out and attempted to ditch. His jet crashed and sank 3.5 miles short of the island. Robinson's plane flipped and his body was never found. Approximately a year after his disappearance, he was awarded a posthumous Distinguished Flying Cross for his service. In 2002, a memorial stone at Virginia's Arlington National Cemetery was erected.

As a result of the collection of samples from the explosion by U.S. Air Force pilots, scientists found traces of the isotopes plutonium-246 and plutonium-244, and confirmed the existence of the predicted but undiscovered elements einsteinium and fermium.

=== King ===
The second test, King, fired the highest-yield (500 kilotons) nuclear fission (A-bomb) weapon to date using only nuclear fission (no fusion nor fusion boosting). This test used an unretarded free-fall bomb from a B-36 bomber. The bomber suffered minor heat and blast damage and safely returned to base. This "Super Oralloy Bomb" was intended as a backup to the earlier "Mike" test, if the fusion weapon had failed.

== Video ==
De-classified Operation-Ivy nuclear test AEC information video

== Summary ==
United States' Ivy series tests and detonations
Name (Note: The US, France and Great Britain have code-named their test events, while the USSR and China did not, and therefore have only test numbers (with some exceptions – Soviet peaceful explosions were named). Word translations into English in parentheses unless the name is a proper noun. A dash followed by a number indicates a member of a salvo event. The US also sometimes named the individual explosions in such a salvo test, which results in "name1 – 1(with name2)". If test is canceled or aborted, then the row data like date and location discloses the intended plans, where known.)	Date time (UT)	Local time zone (Note: To convert the UT time into standard local, add the number of hours in parentheses to the UT time; for local daylight saving time, add one additional hour. If the result is earlier than 00:00, add 24 hours and subtract 1 from the day; if it is 24:00 or later, subtract 24 hours and add 1 to the day. Historical time zone data obtained from the IANA time zone database.)	Location (Note: Rough place name and a latitude/longitude reference; for rocket-carried tests, the launch location is specified before the detonation location, if known. Some locations are extremely accurate; others (like airdrops and space blasts) may be quite inaccurate. "~" indicates a likely pro-forma rough location, shared with other tests in that same area.)	Elevation + height (Note: Elevation is the ground level at the point directly below the explosion relative to sea level; height is the additional distance added or subtracted by tower, balloon, shaft, tunnel, air drop or other contrivance. For rocket bursts the ground level is "N/A". In some cases it is not clear if the height is absolute or relative to ground, for example, Plumbbob/John. No number or units indicates the value is unknown, while "0" means zero. Sorting on this column is by elevation and height added together.)	Delivery, (Note: Atmospheric, airdrop, balloon, gun, cruise missile, rocket, surface, tower, and barge are all disallowed by the Partial Nuclear Test Ban Treaty. Sealed shaft and tunnel are underground, and remained useful under the PTBT. Intentional cratering tests are borderline; they occurred under the treaty, were sometimes protested, and generally overlooked if the test was declared to be a peaceful use.) Purpose (Note: Include weapons development, weapon effects, safety test, transport safety test, war, science, joint verification and industrial/peaceful, which may be further broken down.)	Device (Note: Designations for test items where known, "?" indicates some uncertainty about the preceding value, nicknames for particular devices in quotes. This category of information is often not officially disclosed.)	Yield (Note: Estimated energy yield in tons, kilotons, and megatons. A ton of TNT equivalent is defined as 4.184 gigajoules (1 gigacalorie).)	Fallout (Note: Radioactive emission to the atmosphere aside from prompt neutrons, where known. The measured species is only iodine-131 if mentioned, otherwise it is all species. No entry means unknown, probably none if underground and "all" if not; otherwise notation for whether measured on the site only or off the site, where known, and the measured amount of radioactivity released.)	References	Notes
Mike	October 31, 1952 19:14:59.4	MHT (11 hrs)	Elugelab (Flora), Enewetak Atoll 11.66573°N 162.18928°E	2 m (6 ft 7 in) + 8 m (26 ft)	dry surface, weapons development	"Sausage" w/ TX-5 primary	10.4 Mt			Megaton ("M" as in Mike) device. First true experimental H-bomb, used cryogenic deuterium; became TX-16 weapon. Elugelab completely cratered.
King	November 15, 1952 23:30:00.0	MHT (11 hrs)	Runit (Yvonne), Enewetak Atoll 11.55878°N 162.34541°E	0 + 450 m (1,480 ft)	free air drop, weapons development	Mk-18F SOB	500 kt			Kiloton ("K" as in King) device. Aka Super oralloy bomb (SOB), used 4 critical masses of U235. Largest pure fission device; also tested chain safety device.

== Gallery ==
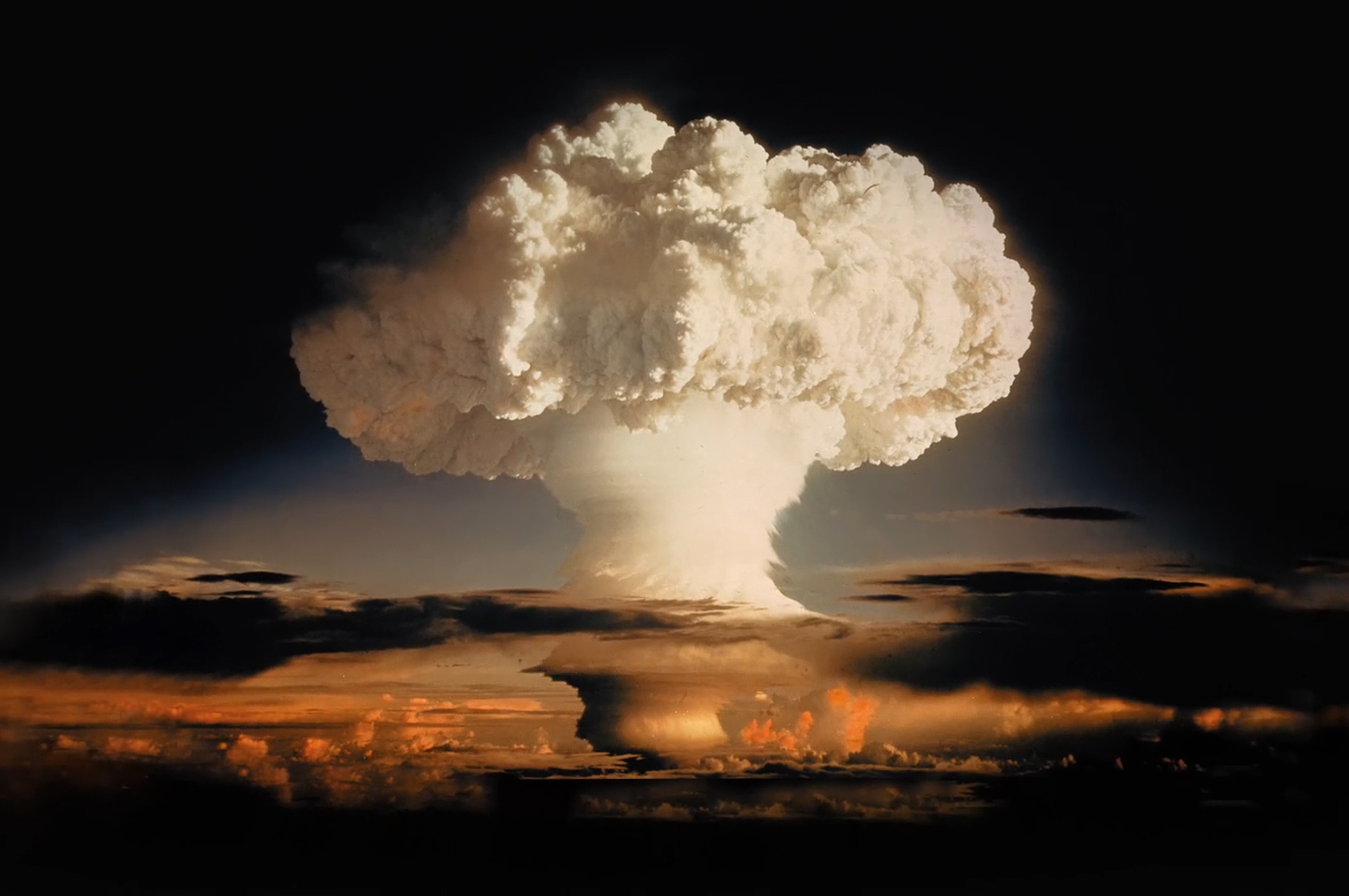
Mike mushroom cloud

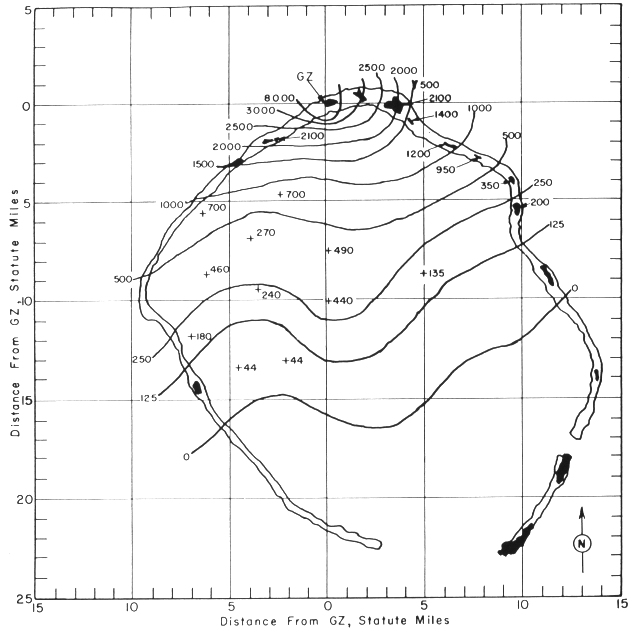
Nuclear fallout map of Mike test. Note that only upwind fallout was monitored.

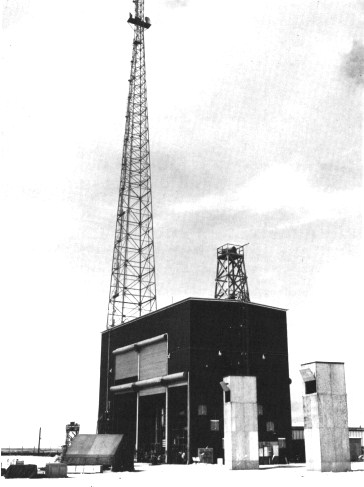
Warehouse building (shot cab) that housed the Mike device

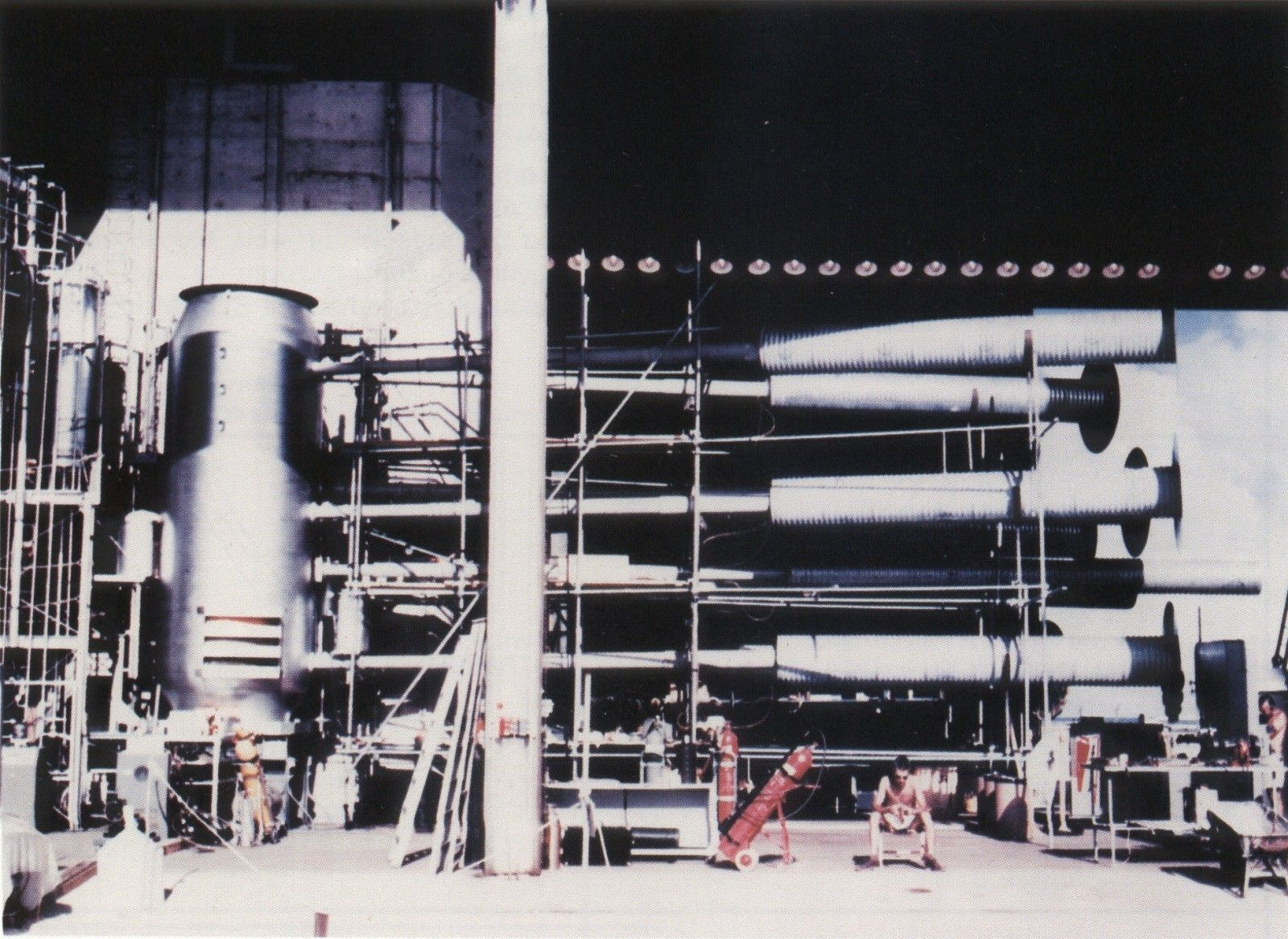
Cylindrical Mike device (left) connected to measuring instrumentation (right)

King's fireball and subsequent mushroom cloud from sea-level view

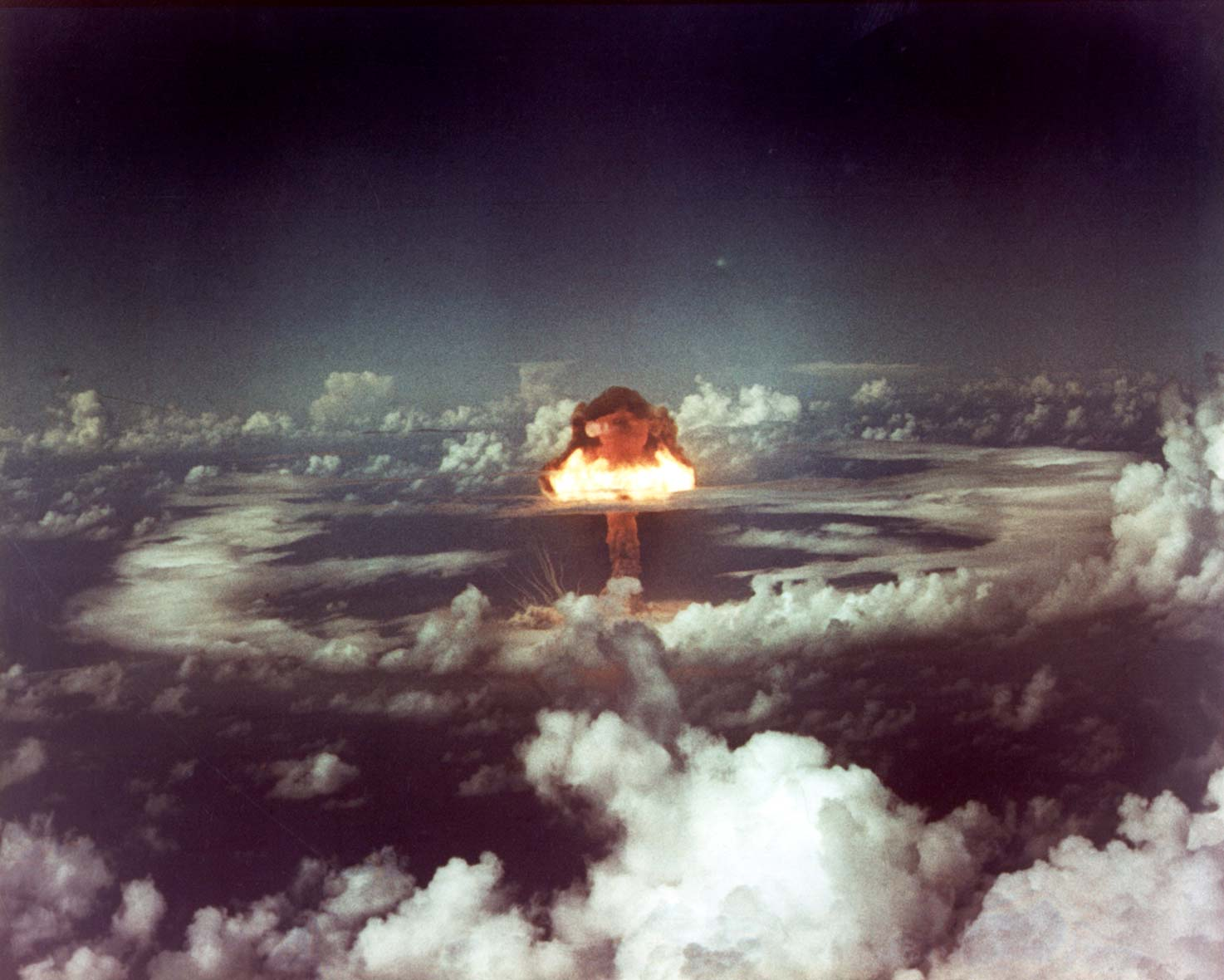
King mushroom cloud

== Aftermath ==
News of the operation leaked immediately. Despite being highly classified, two reporters contacted the Atomic Energy Commission and the Department of Defense less than three hours after the first Ivy shot with knowledge of the exact time the bomb was detonated.

Despite this, Operation Ivy was not officially acknowledged until April 1, 1954, with the release of a 28-minute film for television which included footage of the explosions. Many Americans expressed moral apprehension towards the creation and testing of the hydrogen bombs using in Operation Ivy. Following the release of the film, President Eisenhower attempted to calm the American public by claiming that the hydrogen bomb was "merely a dramatic symbol" of the nation's fears.

== Operation Ivy in popular culture ==
In Sid Meier's Civilization VI and Civilization VII, Operation Ivy is a late game project that the player can construct at one of their cities.

There was an American punk rock band called Operation Ivy, named after the tests.
