= Mark 6 nuclear bomb =

Type of bomb

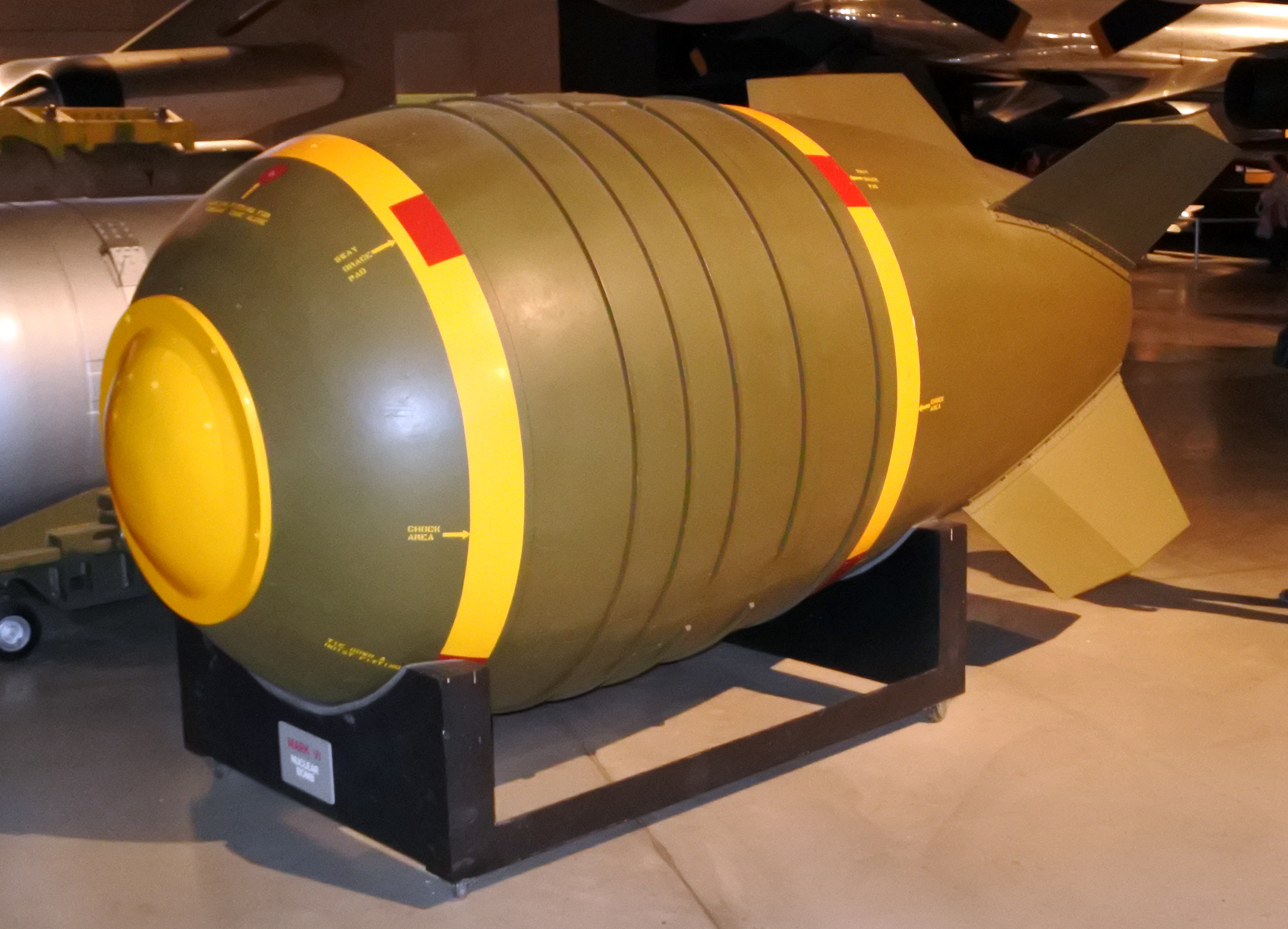
- A Mark 6 nuclear bomb at the National Museum of the United States Air Force.
- Type: Air-dropped Nuclear fission weapon
- Place of origin: United States

Service history
- In service: 1951–1955
- Used by: United States Air Force (USAF)

Production history
- No. built: 1100
- Variants: 6

Specifications
- Mass: 7,600 to 8,500 pounds (3,450 to 3,860 kg)
- Length: 128 in (3,300 mm)
- Diameter: 61 in (1,500 mm)
- Filling: Composite uranium and plutonium fissile pits
- Detonation mechanism: focused high explosive implosion
- Blast yield: 18, 26, 80, 154, 160 kt (75, 109, 335, 644, 669 TJ), depending on construction and/or pit

The Mark 6 nuclear bomb was an American nuclear bomb based on the earlier Mark 4 nuclear bomb and its predecessor, the Mark 3 Fat Man nuclear bomb design.

The Mark 6 was in production from 1951 to 1955 and saw service until 1962. Seven variants and versions were produced, with a total production run of all models of 1100 bombs.

The basic Mark 6 design was 61 inches (150 cm) in diameter and 128 inches (330 cm) long, the same basic dimensions as the Mark 4. Various models of the Mark 6 were roughly 25% lighter than either the Mark 4 or Fat Man, and weighed 7,600 to 8,500 pounds (3,400–3,900 kg).

Early models of the Mark 6 used the same 32-point implosion system design concept as the earlier Mark 4 and Mark 3; the Mark 6 Mod 2 and later used a different, 60-point implosion system.

Various models and pit options gave nuclear yields of 18, 26, 80, 154, and 160 kilotons for Mark 6 models.

== Survivors ==
There are several Mark 6 casings on display:

- Defense Nuclear Weapons School on Kirtland Air Force Base in Albuquerque, New Mexico
- Cold War Gallery of the National Museum of the United States Air Force in Dayton, Ohio
- Museum of Aviation (Warner Robins) in Warner Robins, Georgia
- Hill Aerospace Museum in Ogden, Utah

== Variants ==
=== Mark 13 ===
The Mark 13 nuclear bomb and W13 missile warhead were developed as higher-efficiency Mark 6 successors, the same size and basic configuration as the Mark 6 but utilizing an improved 92-point implosion system. The Mark 13 was cancelled in August 1954 and the W13 cancelled September 1954, in both cases without ever seeing production service.

=== Mark 18 ===
The Mark 18 nuclear bomb was a follow-on to the Mark 6 and Mark 13, utilizing a fissile pit assembly with around 60 kilograms of HEU and delivering a yield of 500 kilotons, the largest pure-fission (non-thermonuclear) bomb design ever developed by the US. Mark 18 bombs were eventually recycled into Mark 6 Mod 6 bombs after thermonuclear weapons were deployed in quantity. The Mark 18 was tested once in Operation Ivy King.

=== XM1 Atomic Demolition Munition ===
An Atomic Demolition Munition, the XM1 was developed. Few details on the system exist.

== Gallery ==
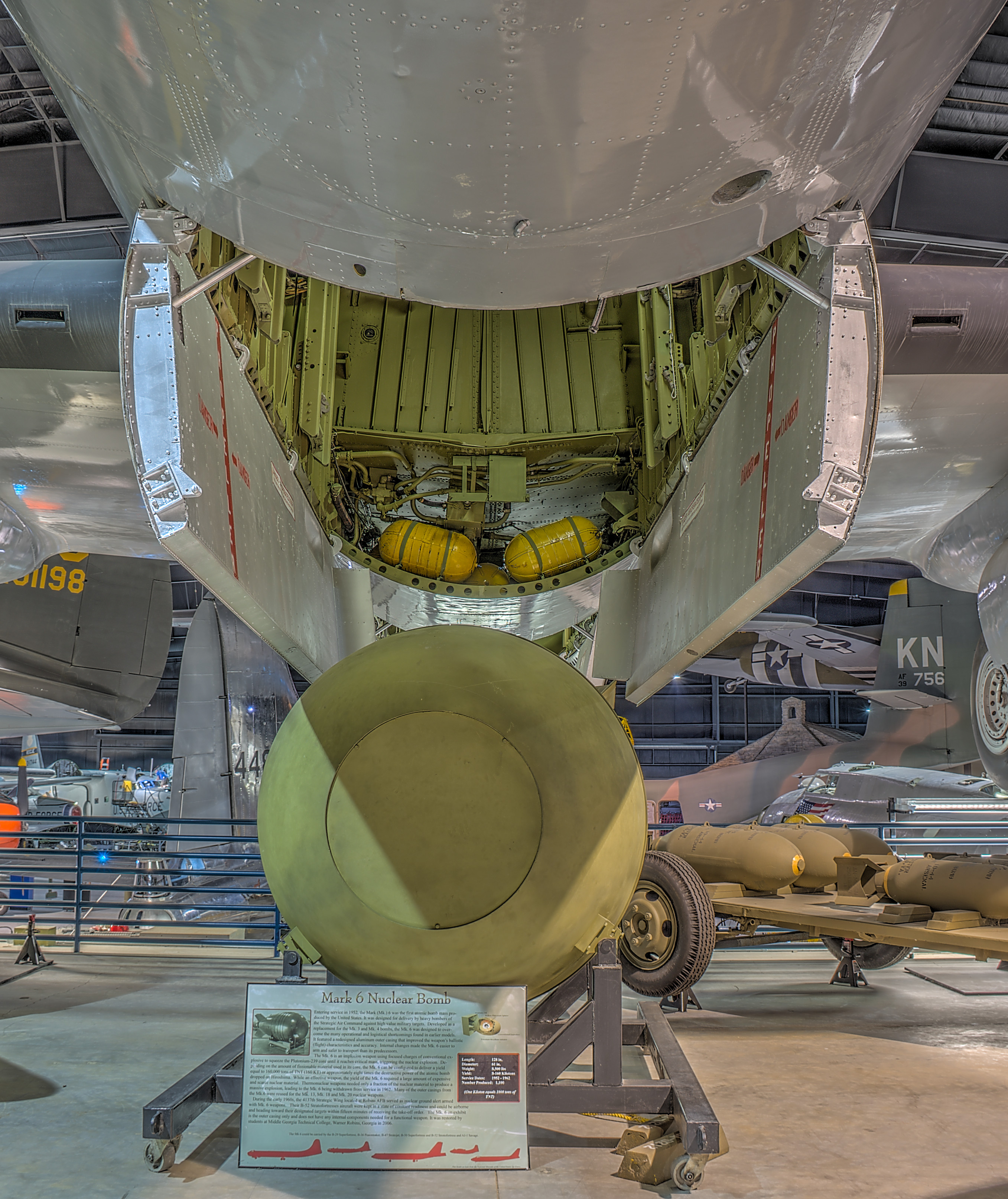

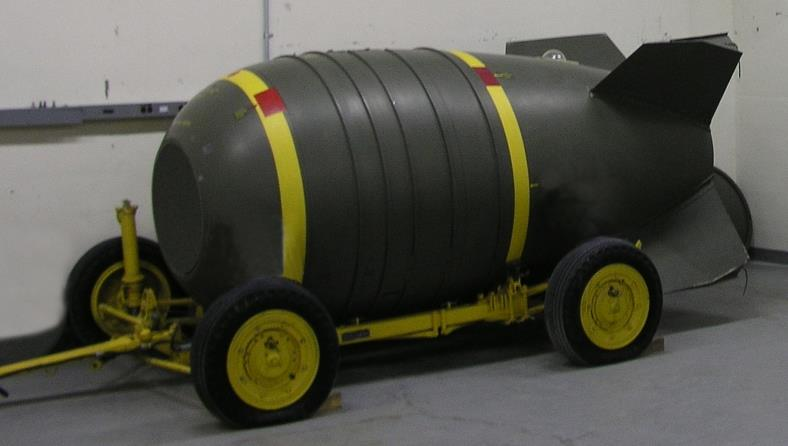

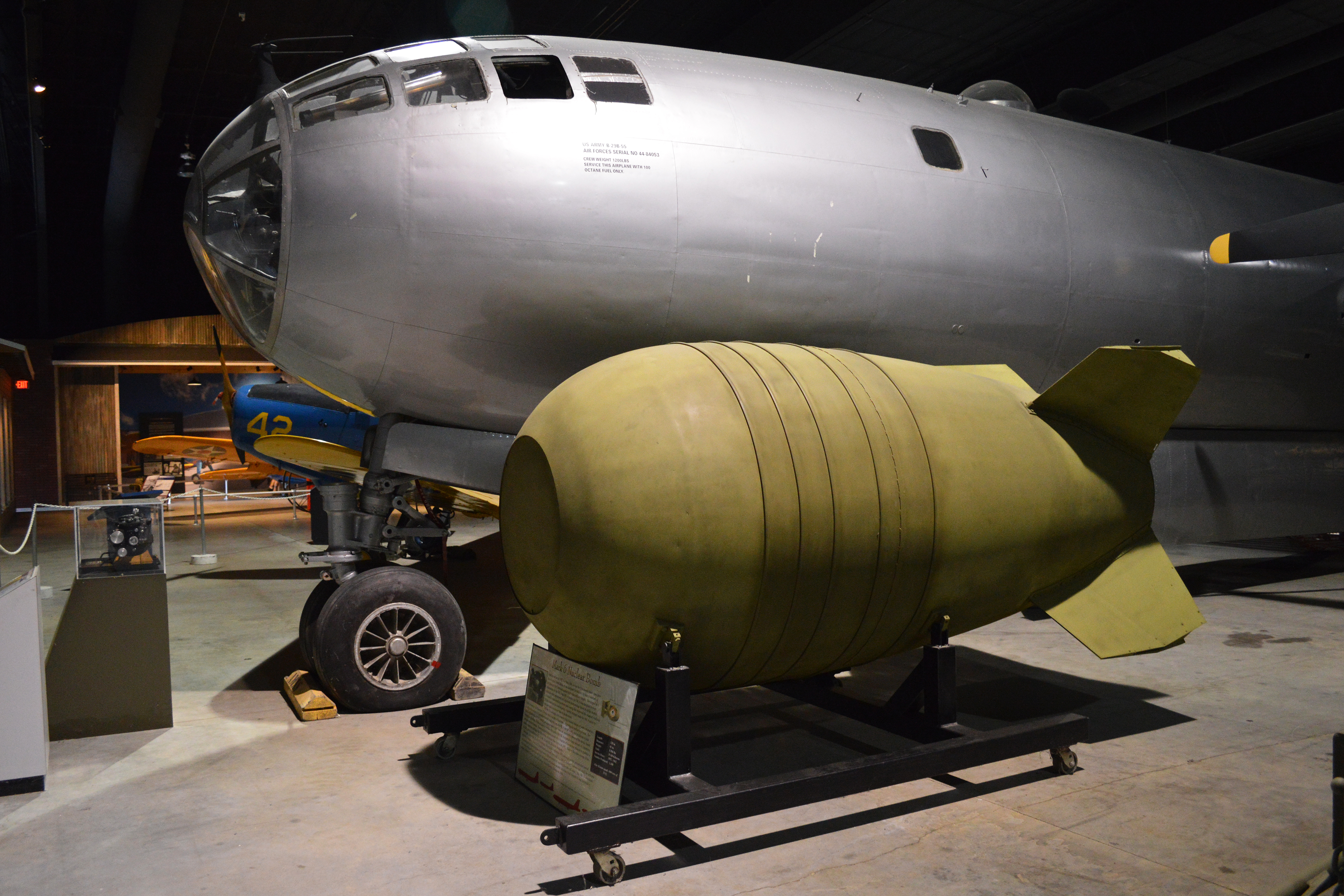

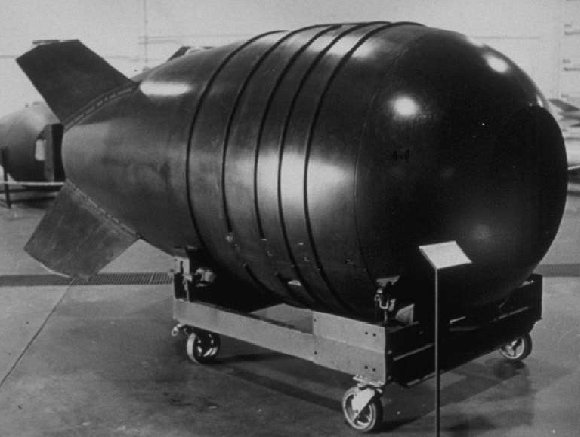

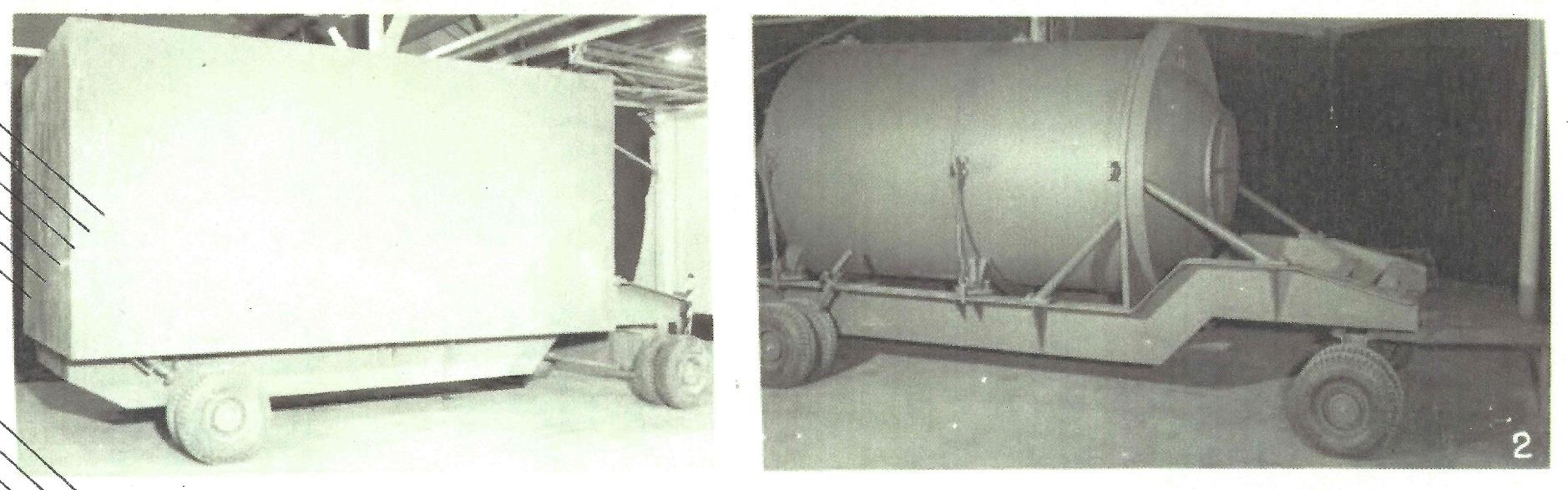
The XM1 ADM that contained a Mark 6 nuclear warhead

== See also ==
- List of nuclear weapons
- 1958 Mars Bluff B-47 nuclear weapon loss incident
