= Tamper (nuclear weapon) =

Nuclear weapon component

In a nuclear weapon, a tamper is an optional layer of dense material surrounding the fissile material. It is used in nuclear weapon design to reduce the critical mass and to delay the expansion of the reacting material through its inertia, which delays the thermal expansion of the fissioning fuel mass, keeping it supercritical longer. Often the same layer serves both as tamper and as neutron reflector. The weapon disintegrates as the reaction proceeds, and this stops the reaction, so the use of a tamper makes for a longer-lasting, more energetic and more efficient explosion. The yield can be further enhanced using a fissionable tamper.

The first nuclear weapons used heavy natural uranium or tungsten carbide tampers, but a heavy tamper necessitates a larger high-explosive implosion system and makes the entire device larger and heavier. The primary stage of a modern thermonuclear weapon may instead use a lightweight beryllium reflector, which is also transparent to X-rays when ionized, allowing the primary's energy output to escape quickly to be used in compressing the secondary stage. More exotic tamper materials such as gold are used for specialized purposes, such as emitting large amounts of X-rays or altering the amount of nuclear fallout.

While the effect of a tamper is to increase efficiency, both by reflecting neutrons and by delaying the expansion of the bomb, the effect on the critical mass is not as great. The reason for this is that the process of reflection is time-consuming. By the time reflected neutrons return to the core, several generations of the chain reaction have passed, meaning the contribution from the older generation is a tiny fraction of the neutron population.

== Function ==
In Atomic Energy for Military Purposes (1945), physicist Henry DeWolf Smyth describes the function of a tamper in nuclear weapon design as similar to the neutron reflector used in a nuclear reactor:

A similar envelope can be used to reduce the critical size of the bomb, but here the envelope has an additional role: its very inertia delays the expansion of the reacting material. For this reason such an envelope is often called a tamper. Use of a tamper clearly makes for a longer lasting, more energetic and more efficient explosion.

== History ==
The concept of surrounding the core of a nuclear weapon with a tamper was introduced by Robert Serber in his Los Alamos Primer, a series of lectures given in April 1943 as part of the Manhattan Project, which built the first nuclear weapons. He noted that since inertia was the key, the densest materials were preferable, and he identified gold, rhenium, tungsten and uranium as the best candidates. He believed they also had good neutron-reflecting properties, although he cautioned that a great deal more work needed to be done in this area. Using elementary diffusion theory, he predicted that the critical mass of a nuclear weapon with a tamper would be one-eighth that of an identical but untamped weapon. He added that in practice this would only be about a quarter instead of an eighth.

Serber noted that the neutron reflection property was not as good as it might first seem, because the neutrons returning from collisions in the tamper would take time to do so. He estimated that for a uranium tamper they might take about 10^{−7} seconds. By the time reflected neutrons return to the core, several generations of the chain reaction would have passed, meaning the contribution from the older generation is a tiny fraction of the neutron population. The returning neutrons would also be slowed by the collision. It followed that 15% more fissile material was required to get the same energy release with a gold tamper compared to a uranium one, despite the fact that the critical masses differed by 50%. At the time, the critical masses of uranium (and more particularly plutonium) were not precisely known. It was thought that uranium with a uranium tamper might be about 25 kg, while that of plutonium would be about 5 kg.

The Little Boy uranium bomb used in the atomic bombing of Hiroshima had a tungsten carbide tamper. This was important not just for neutron reflection but also for its strength in preventing the projectile from blowing through the target. The tamper had a radius of 17.5 centimetres (6.9 in) and a thickness of 11.3 centimetres (4.4 in), for a mass of 317 kilograms (699 lb). This was about 3.5 times the mass of the fissile material used. Tungsten carbide has a high density and a low neutron absorbency cross section. Despite being available in adequate quantity during the Manhattan Project, depleted uranium was not used because it has a relatively high rate of spontaneous fission of about 675 per kg per second; a 300 kg depleted uranium tamper would therefore have an unacceptable chance of initiating a predetonation. Tungsten carbide was commonly used in uranium-233 gun-type nuclear weapons used with artillery pieces for the same reason.

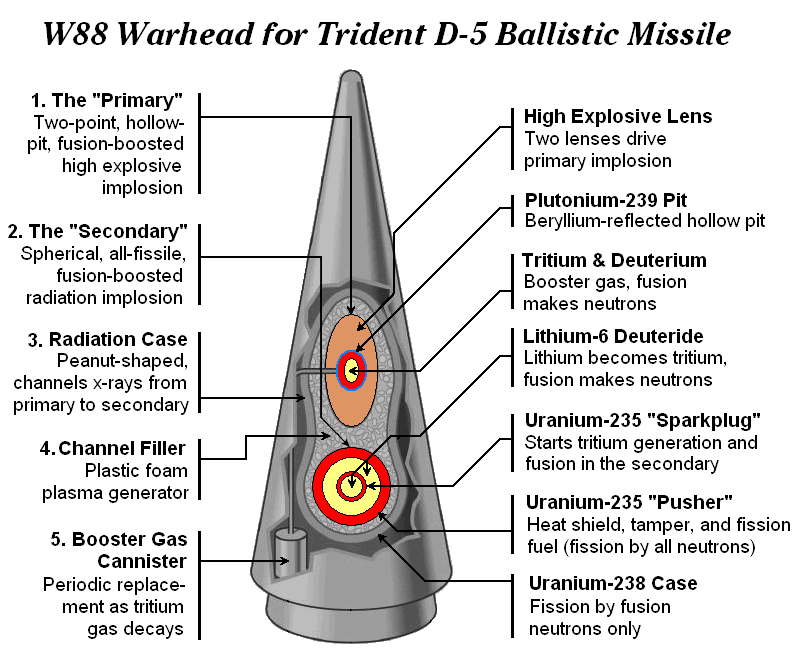
In the W88 warhead, the primary uses a lightweight beryllium tamper, while the secondary has a heavyweight uranium-235 one.

There are advantages to using a fissionable tamper to increase the yield. Uranium-238 will fission when struck by a neutron with 1.6 megaelectronvolts (0.26 pJ), and about half the neutrons produced by the fission of uranium-235 will exceed this threshold. However, a fast neutron striking a uranium-238 nucleus is eight times as likely to be inelastically scattered as to produce a fission, and when it does so, it is slowed to the point below the fission threshold of uranium-238. In the Fat Man type used in the Trinity test and at Nagasaki, the tamper consisted of 7.0-centimetre (2.75 in) shells of natural uranium and aluminium. It is estimated that up to 30% of the yield came from fission of the natural uranium tamper. An estimated 14.5 tonnes of TNT (61 GJ) of the 21 kilotonnes of TNT (88 TJ) yield was contributed by the photofission of the tamper.

In a boosted fission weapon or a thermonuclear weapon, the 14.1-megaelectronvolt (2.26 pJ) neutrons produced by a deuterium-tritium reaction can remain sufficiently energetic to fission uranium-238 even after three collisions with deuterium, but the 2.45-megaelectronvolt (0.393 pJ) ones produced by deuterium-deuterium fusion no longer have sufficient energy after even a single collision. A uranium-235 tamper will fission even with slow neutrons. A highly enriched uranium tamper is therefore more efficient than a depleted uranium one, and a smaller tamper can be used to achieve the same yield. The use of enriched uranium tampers therefore became more common once enriched uranium became more plentiful.

An important development after World War II was the lightweight beryllium tamper. In a boosted device the thermonuclear reactions greatly increase the production of neutrons, which makes the inertial property of tampers less important. Beryllium has a low slow neutron absorbency cross section but a very high scattering cross section. When struck by high energy neutrons produced by fission reactions, beryllium emits neutrons. With a 10-centimeter (4 in) beryllium reflector, the critical mass of highly enriched uranium is 14.1 kg, compared with 52.5 kg in an untamped sphere. A beryllium tamper also minimizes the loss of X-rays, which is important for a thermonuclear primary which uses its X-rays to compress the secondary stage.

The beryllium tamper had been considered by the Manhattan Project, but beryllium was in short supply, and experiments with a beryllium tamper did not commence until after the war. Physicist Louis Slotin was killed in May 1946 in a criticality accident involving one. A device with a beryllium tamper was successfully tested in the Operation Tumbler–Snapper How shot on 5 June 1952, and since then beryllium has been widely used as a tamper in thermonuclear primaries. The secondary's tamper (or "pusher") functions to reflect neutrons, confine the fusion fuel with its inertial mass, and enhance the yield with its fissions produced by neutrons emitted from the thermonuclear reactions. It also helps drive the radiation implosion and prevent the loss of thermal energy. For this reason, the heavy tamper is still preferred.

== Alternative materials ==
Thorium can also be used as a fissionable tamper. It has an atomic weight nearly as high as uranium and a lower propensity to fission, which means that the tamper has to be much thicker. It is possible that a state seeking to develop nuclear weapons capability might add reactor-grade plutonium to a natural uranium tamper. This would cause problems with neutron emissions from the plutonium, but it might be possible to overcome this with a layer of boron-10, which has a high neutron cross section for the absorption of the slow neutrons that fission uranium-235 and plutonium-239, but a low cross-section for the absorption of the fast neutrons that fission uranium-238. It was used in thermonuclear weapons to protect the plutonium spark plug from stray neutrons emitted by the uranium-238 tamper. In the Fat Man type the natural uranium tamper was coated with boron.

Non-fissionable materials can be used as tampers. Sometimes these were substituted for fissionable ones in nuclear tests where a high yield was unnecessary. The most commonly used non-fissionable tamper material is lead, which is both widely available and cheap. British designs often used a lead-bismuth alloy. Bismuth has the highest atomic number of any non-fissionable tamper material. The use of lead and bismuth reduces nuclear fallout, as neither produces isotopes that emit significant amounts of gamma radiation when irradiated with neutrons.

The W71 warhead used in the LIM-49 Spartan anti-ballistic missile had a gold tamper around its secondary to maximize its output of X-rays, which it used to incapacitate incoming nuclear warheads. The irradiation of gold-197 produces gold-198, which has a half-life of 2.697 days and emits 0.412-megaelectronvolt (0.0660 pJ) gamma rays and 0.96-megaelectronvolt (0.154 pJ) beta particles. It therefore produces short-lived but intense radiation, which may have battlefield uses, although this was not its purpose in the W71. Another element evaluated by the US for such a purpose was tantalum. Natural tantalum is almost entirely tantalum-181, which when irradiated with neutrons become tantalum-182, a beta and gamma ray emitter with a half-life of 115 days.

In the theoretical cobalt bomb, cobalt is poor prospect for a tamper because it is relatively light and ionizes at 9.9 kiloelectronvolts (1.59 fJ). Natural cobalt is entirely cobalt-59, which becomes cobalt-60 when irradiated with neutrons. With a half-life of 5.26 years, this could produce long-lasting radioactive contamination. The British Tadje nuclear test at Maralinga used cobalt pellets as a "tracer" for determining yield. This fuelled rumours that Britain had been developing a cobalt bomb.

== Physics ==
The diffusion equation for the number of neutrons within a bomb core is given by:

$$\frac{\partial N}{ \partial t} = \frac {v_n}{ \lambda^{core}_f} (\nu - 1) N + \frac { \lambda^{core}_t v_n }{ 3 } (\nabla^2 N)$$

where $N$ is the number density of neutrons, $v_n$ is the average neutron velocity, $\nu$ is the number of secondary neutrons produced per fission, $\lambda^{core}_f$ is the fission mean free path and $\lambda^{core}_t$ is transport mean free path for neutrons in the core.

$N$ doesn't depend on the direction, so we can use this form of the Laplace operator in spherical coordinates:

$$\nabla^2 N = \frac{1}{r^2} \frac{\partial}{\partial r} \bigl(r^2 \frac{\partial N}{\partial r} \bigr)$$

Solving the separable partial differential equation gives us:

$$N_{core} (r, t) = N_0  e^{(\alpha / \tau) t} \Bigl[  \frac {sin ( r / d_{core}  )}{  r  } \Bigr]$$

where

$$\tau = \lambda^{core}_f / v_n$$

and

$$d_{core} = \sqrt { \frac { \lambda^{core}_f  \lambda^{core}_t }{3 (- \alpha + \nu - 1) } }$$

For the tamper, the first term in the first equation relating to the production of neutrons can be disregarded, leaving:

$$\frac{\partial N}{ \partial t} = \frac { \lambda^{core}_t v_n }{ 3 } (\nabla^2 N)$$

Set the separation constant as $\delta / \tau$. If $\delta = 0$ (meaning that the neutron density in the tamper is constant) the solution becomes:

$$N_{tamper} = \frac {A}{r} + B$$

Where $A$ and $B$ are constants of integration.

If $\delta > 0$ (meaning that the neutron density in the tamper is growing) the solution becomes:

$$N_{tamper} =  e^{(\delta / \tau) t} \Bigl[ A \frac{e^{r / d_{tamper} }}{r} + B \frac{e^{-r / d_{tamper} }}{r} \Bigr]$$

where

$$d_{tamper} = \sqrt {  \frac {\lambda^{core}_f  \lambda^{tamper}_t }{3\delta} }$$

Serber noted that at the boundary between the core and the tamper, the diffusion stream of neutrons must be continuous, so if the core has radius $R_{core}$ then:

$$N_{core} (R_{core}) = N_{tamper} (R_{core})$$

If the neutron velocity in the core and the tamper is the same, then $\alpha = \delta$ and:

$$\lambda^{core}_t {\Bigl(  \frac { \partial N_{core} }  {\partial r } \Bigr)}_{R_{core}} = \lambda^{tamper}_t \Bigl(  \frac { \partial N_{tamper} }  {\partial r } \Bigr)_{R_{core}}$$

Otherwise each side would have to be multiplied by the relevant neutron velocity. Also:

$$N_{tamper} (R_{tamper}) = - \frac {2}{3} \lambda^{tamper}_t  \Bigl(  \frac { \partial N_{tamper} }  {\partial r } \Bigr)_{R_{core}}$$

For the case where $\alpha = \delta = 0$:

$$\Bigl[ 1 + \frac {2 R^{threshold}_{tamper} \lambda^{tamper}_t } { 3 R^2_{tamper} } - \frac { R^{threshold}_{tamper} } { R_{tamper} } \Bigr] \Bigl[ \Bigl( \frac {R^{threshold}_{tamper}}{ d_{core}  } \Bigr) cot \Bigl( \frac {R^{threshold}_{tamper}}{ d_{core}  } \Bigr) - 1 \Bigr] + \frac { \lambda^{tamper}_t} {\lambda^{core}_t} = 0$$

If the tamper is really thick, ie $R_{tamper} \gg R^{threshold}_{tamper}$ this can be approximated as:

$$\Bigl( \frac {R^{threshold}_{tamper}}{ d_{core}  } \Bigr) cot \Bigl( \frac {R^{threshold}_{tamper}}{ d_{core}  } \Bigr) = 1 - \frac { \lambda^{tamper}_t} {\lambda^{core}_t}$$

If the tamper (unrealistically) is a vacuum, then the neutron scattering cross section would be zero and $\lambda^{tamper}_t = \infty$. The equation becomes:

$$\Bigl( \frac {R^{threshold}_{tamper}}{ d_{core}  } \Bigr) cot \Bigl( \frac {R^{threshold}_{tamper}}{ d_{core}  } \Bigr) = -\infty$$

which is satisfied by:

$$\Bigl( \frac {R^{threshold}_{tamper}}{ d_{core}  } \Bigr) = \pi$$

If the tamper is very thick and has neutron scattering properties similar to the core, ie:

$$\lambda^{tamper}_t \sim \lambda^{core}_t$$

Then the equation becomes:

$$\Bigl( \frac {R^{threshold}_{tamper}}{ d_{core}  } \Bigr) cot \Bigl( \frac {R^{threshold}_{tamper}}{ d_{core}  } \Bigr) = 0$$

which is satisfied when:

$$\frac {R^{threshold}_{tamper}}{ d_{core}  } = \pi/2$$

In this case, the critical radius is twice what it would be if no tamper were present. Since the volume is proportional to the cube of the radius, we reach Serber's conclusion that an eightfold reduction in the critical mass is theoretically possible.
