= Mark 4 nuclear bomb =

Air-dropped nuclear fission weapon

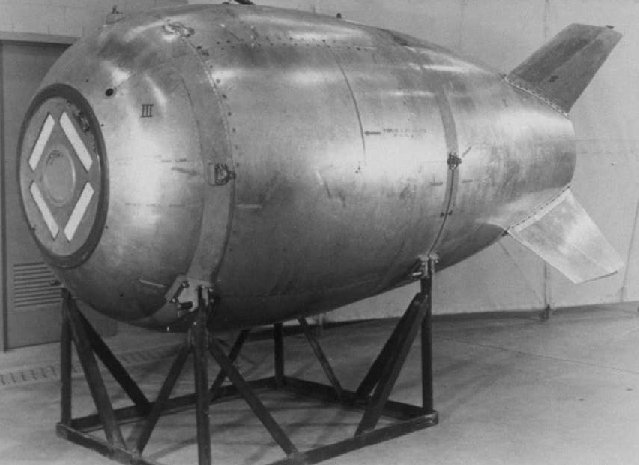
- A Mark 4N riveted aluminum bomb casing. Stockpile Mk 4s used a 2,830 lb (1,280 kg) steel casing.
- Type: Air-dropped Nuclear fission weapon
- Place of origin: United States

Service history
- In service: 1949–1953
- Used by: United States Air Force (USAF)

Production history
- No. built: About 550

Specifications
- Mass: 10,800 to 10,900 pounds (4,900 to 4,940 kg)
- Length: 128 in (3,300 mm)
- Diameter: 60 in (1,500 mm)
- Crew: 1x Weaponeer for pit insertion and arming
- Filling: Composite uranium and plutonium fissile pits
- Detonation mechanism: focused high explosive implosion
- Blast yield: 1, 3.5, 8, 14, 21, 22, 31 kt (4.2, 14.6, 33.5, 58.6, 87.9, 92.0, 129.7 TJ), depending on construction and/or pit

The Mark 4 nuclear bomb was an American implosion-type nuclear bomb based on the earlier Mark 3 Fat Man design, used in the Trinity test and the bombing of Nagasaki. With the Mark 3 needing each individual component to be hand-assembled by only highly trained technicians under closely controlled conditions, the purpose of the Mark 4 was to produce an atomic weapon as a practical piece of ordnance. The Mark 4 Mod 0 entered the stockpile starting March 19, 1949 and was in use until 1953. With over 500 units procured, the Mark 4 was the first mass-produced nuclear weapon.

== Design ==
The Mark 4 utilized a near-identical nuclear explosive package to the 1561 assembly of the Mark 3 Fat Man, but the newly-formed Z Division of Los Alamos focused on re-engineering the electronics and conventional explosives packages to be more modular for easier assembly in the field. The priority objectives of the Mark 4 bomb program were to have the ability to monitor the weapon battery and electrical systems while being carried within the bomb bay of an aircraft to target. Many issues slowed and delayed the design and production of the Mark 4, the first of which was the formation and physical placement of Z Division facilities. The early days of Z Division highlighted the lack of infrastructure and logistics of the nuclear weapon enterprise when production of weapon components had to slow due to lack of basic electrical supplies like soldering rosin and hook-up wire. Personnel from Z Division were also used to assist with the Mark 3 tests in Operation Crossroads in 1946 and again for weapons testing at Enewetak for Operation Sandstone in 1948. Though, between tests following a request from Congress on a report on the status of nuclear ordnance, Los Alamos Scientific Laboratory was able to report positive accomplishments such as developing a 'cartridge-type' assembly to house fuzing components and the decision to implement the 'Archie' radar. Along with other developments for the radar, the main component of the system was the APS/13 Tail Warning device which eventually became the 'Archie'. This radar device would close a relay at a predetermined altitude, using four units in each fuze, requiring at least two to fire, allowing a firing signal to proceed. Despite the delays of the early weapons tests, development and stockpile production of the weapon were solidified and streamlined with the rising tensions in Berlin.

The Mark 4 Mod 0 was 60 inches (1.5 m) in diameter and 128 inches (3.3 m) long, the same basic dimensions as Mark 3. It weighed slightly more at 10,800 to 10,900 pounds (4,900 to 4,940 kg), depending on the specific Mark 4 version. (Mark 3 weighed 10,300 lb or 4,670 kg.)

In addition to being easier to manufacture, the Mark 4 Mod 1 introduced the concept of in-flight insertion (IFI), a weapons safety concept which was used for a number of years. An IFI bomb has either manual or mechanical assembly, which keeps the nuclear core stored outside the bomb until close to the point that it may be dropped. Arming the Mark 4 required opening the casing's front hatch, removing the forward polar cap, two outer pentagonal lenses with their detonators, and two inner explosive blocks, and exposing the pit (the lenses and blocks weighed an aggregate 156 kilograms). The pit's aluminum pusher had a removable 12 centimeter diameter, 1 kilogram trap door, and its uranium tamper had a removable 12 centimeter diameter, 3 kilogram trap door. The weaponeer could then insert or remove the core with the use of a special vacuum tool.

Mark 4 models used composite uranium and plutonium fissile pits, as well as uranium and plutonium only pits. The exact pit assemblies were common with several other U.S. nuclear weapons, the Type C and Type D pit assemblies.

Along with being composite cores, the device was the first weapon to rely upon levitated-pit implosion. These early weapons with a levitated pit had a removable pit, called an open-pit. It was stored separately, in a special capsule called a birdcage. Various versions of the Mark 4 had explosive yields of 1, 3.5, 8, 14, 21, 22, and 31 kilotons (4 to 130 TJ).

== Operational history ==
Atomic Energy Commission nuclear weapons orientation film regarding assembling and safe-ing, ft. Mark 4, 5, 6, 7 and atomic artillery.

About 550 Mark 4 nuclear weapons were produced. The Mark 4 was succeeded by the Mk6, which was generally similar but much improved.

Beginning in 1950, the US military began to deploy non-nuclear Mark 4 assemblies overseas, including in the United Kingdom (July 1950), and aboard several aircraft carriers in 1950 and 1951. A contingent of 9 Mark 4 non-nuclear assemblies were deployed to Guam in 1950, and Truman authorized the transfer of fissile cores to the base in April 1951.

== W4 missile warhead ==
A variant called the W4 (Warhead 4), intended for use on the SM-62 Snark cruise missile, was designed but never built. The W4 design was canceled in 1951.

== Surviving casing ==
There is a sole surviving Mark 4 nuclear weapon casing located at the China Lake Museum in California.

== Accidents ==
Several nuclear weapons accidents occurred with Mark 4 non-nuclear assemblies in 1950. These accidents included:

- 1950 British Columbia B-36 crash (February 13, 1950)
- 1950 Albuquerque, NM B-29 crash (April 11, 1950)
- 1950 Lebanon, OH B-50 crash (July 13, 1950)
- 1950 Fairfield-Suisun Boeing B-29 crash (August 5, 1950)
- 1950 Rivière-du-Loup B-50 nuclear weapon loss incident (November 10, 1950)

None of these accidents could have achieved a nuclear yield, because they all involved non-nuclear Mark 4 assemblies which lacked the fissile material cores. By order of President Harry S. Truman, the US military was denied access to US nuclear components from 1947 through 1951, as they were kept in the exclusive custody of the U.S. Atomic Energy Commission unless transferred to the military by the president.

== See also ==
- List of nuclear weapons
