= Robert Schwartz =

Robert Schwartz may refer to:

- Robert Schwartz (water polo) (born 1939), South African Olympic water polo player
- Robert A. Schwartz (born 1947), American physician
- Bobby Schwartz (Robert Benjamin Schwartz, born 1956), American motorcycle speedway racer
- Robert Towne (Robert Bertram Schwartz, 1934–2024), American screenwriter and director
- Robert J. Schwartz, stockbroker founded Economists for Peace and Security, an NGO
- Bob Schwartz (Robert Risdon Schwartz, born 1950), American healthcare executive in Tennessee
- Robert S. Schwartz, American orthopedic footwear specialist and CEO
- Robert Schwartz, American designer of the M65 atomic cannon
- Robert Schwartz, American scientist murdered by his daughter in 2001

== See also ==
- Robert Swartz, American businessman
- Robert Schwarz (disambiguation)
- Robert Schwartzman, American director and musician
