= Gun-type fission weapon =

Fission-based nuclear weapon

The "gun" assembly method

Gun-type fission weapons are fission-based nuclear weapons whose design assembles their fissile material into a supercritical mass by the use of the "gun" method: shooting one piece of sub-critical material into another. Although this is sometimes pictured as two sub-critical hemispheres driven together to make a supercritical sphere, typically, a hollow projectile is shot onto a cylindrical spike, which fills the hole in its center. Its name is a reference to the fact that it is shooting the material through an artillery barrel as if it were a projectile. Developed and deployed by the Manhattan Project, gun-type designs were quickly replaced by the more efficient implosion-type weapons.

All known gun-type fission weapons have used highly enriched uranium (HEU). The high spontaneous fission rates of plutonium isotopes make it very impractical for use in gun-type designs, as in the abandoned Thin Man design. Additionally, the efficiency is low, increasing the amount of HEU required and weapon weight. The main reason for this is the fissile material does not undergo compression (and resulting density increase) as does the implosion design. Instead, gun-type bombs assemble the supercritical mass by amassing such a quantity of uranium that daughter neutrons must travel enough mean free paths of distance that they collide with more than one ^{235}U nucleus on average, before escaping the supercritical mass. HEU could be more efficiently used by the composite cores of early implosion-type weapons.

The first time gun-type fission weapons were discussed was as part of the British Tube Alloys nuclear bomb development program, the world's first nuclear bomb development program. The British MAUD Report of 1941 laid out how "an effective uranium bomb which, containing some 25 lb of active material, would be equivalent as regards destructive effect to 1,800 tons of T.N.T". The bomb would use the gun-type design "to bring the two halves together at high velocity and it is proposed to do this by firing them together with charges of ordinary explosive in a form of double gun".

The method was applied in four known US programs. First, the "Little Boy" weapon which was detonated over Hiroshima and several additional units of the same design prepared after World War II, in 40 Mark 8 bombs, and their replacement, 40 Mark 11 bombs. Both the Mark 8 and Mark 11 designs were intended for use as earth-penetrating bombs (see nuclear bunker buster), for which the gun-type method was preferred for a time by designers who were less than certain that early implosion-type weapons would successfully detonate following an impact. The second program was a family of 11-inch (280 mm) nuclear artillery shells, the W9 and its derivative W19, plus a repackaged W19 in a 16-inch (406 mm) shell for US Navy battleships, the W23. The third family was an 8-inch (203 mm) artillery shell, the W33.

South Africa also developed six nuclear bombs based on the gun-type principle, and was working on missile warheads using the same basic design.

There are currently no known gun-type weapons in service: advanced nuclear weapon states tended to abandon the design in favor of the implosion-type weapons, which were also used to create boosted fission weapons and thermonuclear weapons. All known gun-type nuclear weapons previously built worldwide have been dismantled.

== Little Boy ==
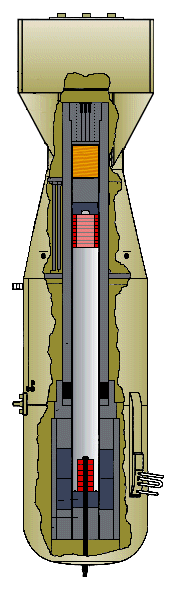
The interior of the Little Boy weapon used against Hiroshima. The uranium-235 is indicated in red.

The "gun" method is roughly how the Little Boy weapon, which was detonated over Hiroshima, worked, using uranium-235 as its fissile material. In the Little Boy design, the U-235 "bullet" had a mass of around 86 pounds (39 kg), and it was 7 inches (17.8 cm) long, with a diameter of 6.25 inches (15.9 cm). The hollow cylindrical shape made it subcritical. It was powered by a cordite charge. The uranium target spike was about 57.3 pounds (26 kg). Both the bullet and the target consisted of multiple rings stacked together.

The use of "rings" had two advantages: it allowed the larger bullet to confidently remain subcritical (the hollow column served to keep the material from having too much contact with other material), and it allowed sub-critical assemblies to be tested using the same bullet but with just one ring.

The barrel had an inside diameter of 6.5 inches (16.5 cm). Its length was 70.8 inches (1.8 m), which allowed the bullet to accelerate to its final speed of about 1,000 feet per second (300 m/s) before coming into contact with the target.

When the bullet is at a distance of 9.8 inches (25 cm), the combination becomes critical. This means that some free neutrons may cause the chain reaction to take place before the material could be fully joined (see nuclear chain reaction).

Typically the chain reaction takes less than 1 μs (100 shakes), during which time the bullet travels only 0.3 mm (1/85 inch). Although the chain reaction is slower when the supercriticality is low, it still happens in a time so brief that the bullet hardly moves in that time.

This could cause a fizzle, a predetonation which would blow the material apart before creating much of an explosion. Thus, it is important that the frequency at which free neutrons occur is kept low, compared with the assembly time from this point. This also means that the speed of the projectile must be sufficiently high; its speed can be increased but this requires a longer and heavier barrel, or a higher pressure of the propellant gas for greater acceleration of the bullet subcritical mass.

In the case of Little Boy, the 20% ^{238}U in the uranium had 70 spontaneous fissions per second. With the fissionable material in a supercritical state, each gave a large probability of detonation: each fission creates on average 2.52 neutrons, which each have a probability of more than 1:2.52 of creating another fission. During the 1.35 ms of supercriticality prior to full assembly, there was a 10% probability of a fission, with somewhat less probability of pre-detonation.

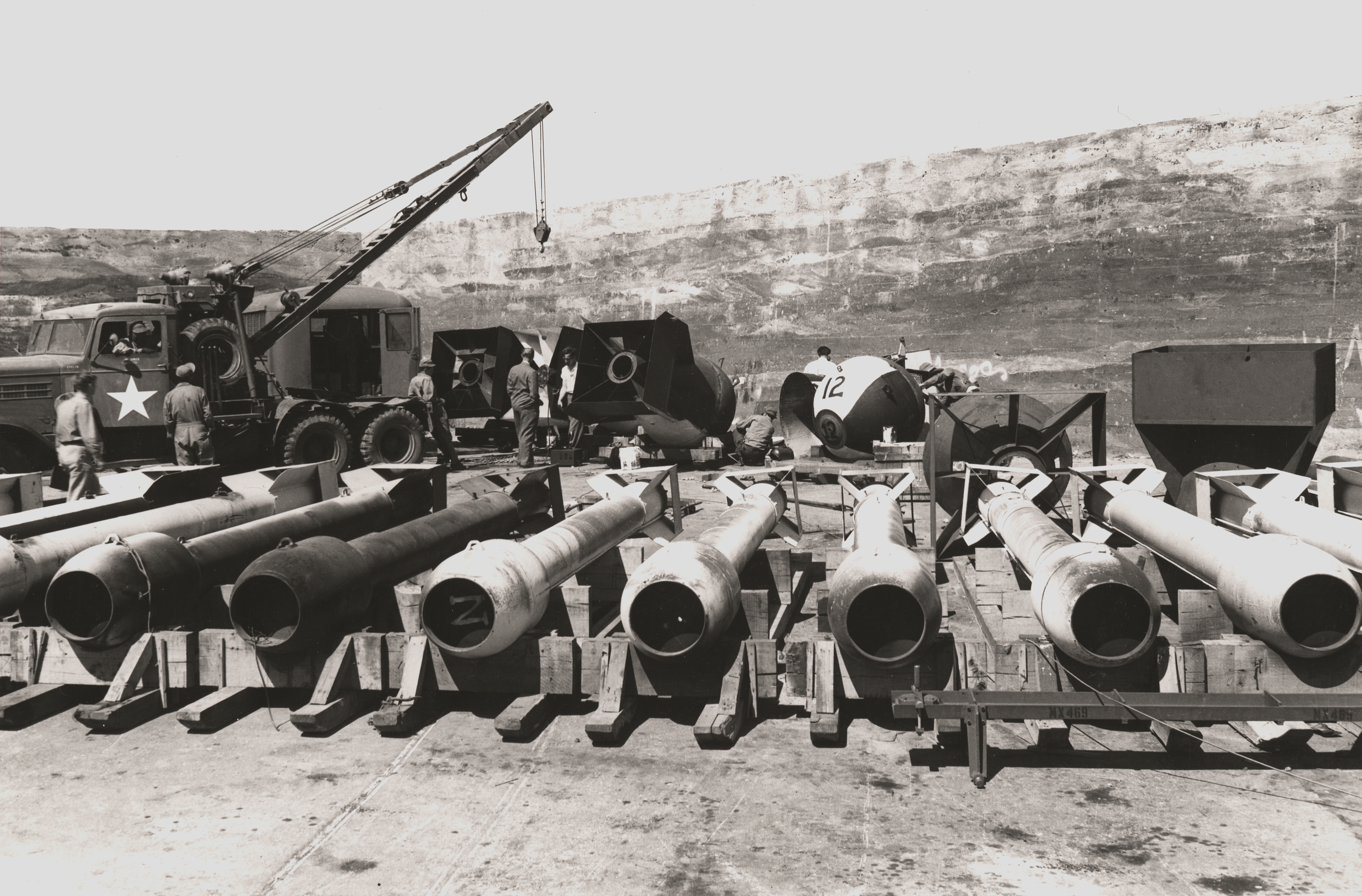
In July 1944 the laboratory abandoned the plutonium gun-type bomb ("Thin Man", shown above) and focused almost entirely around the problem of implosion.

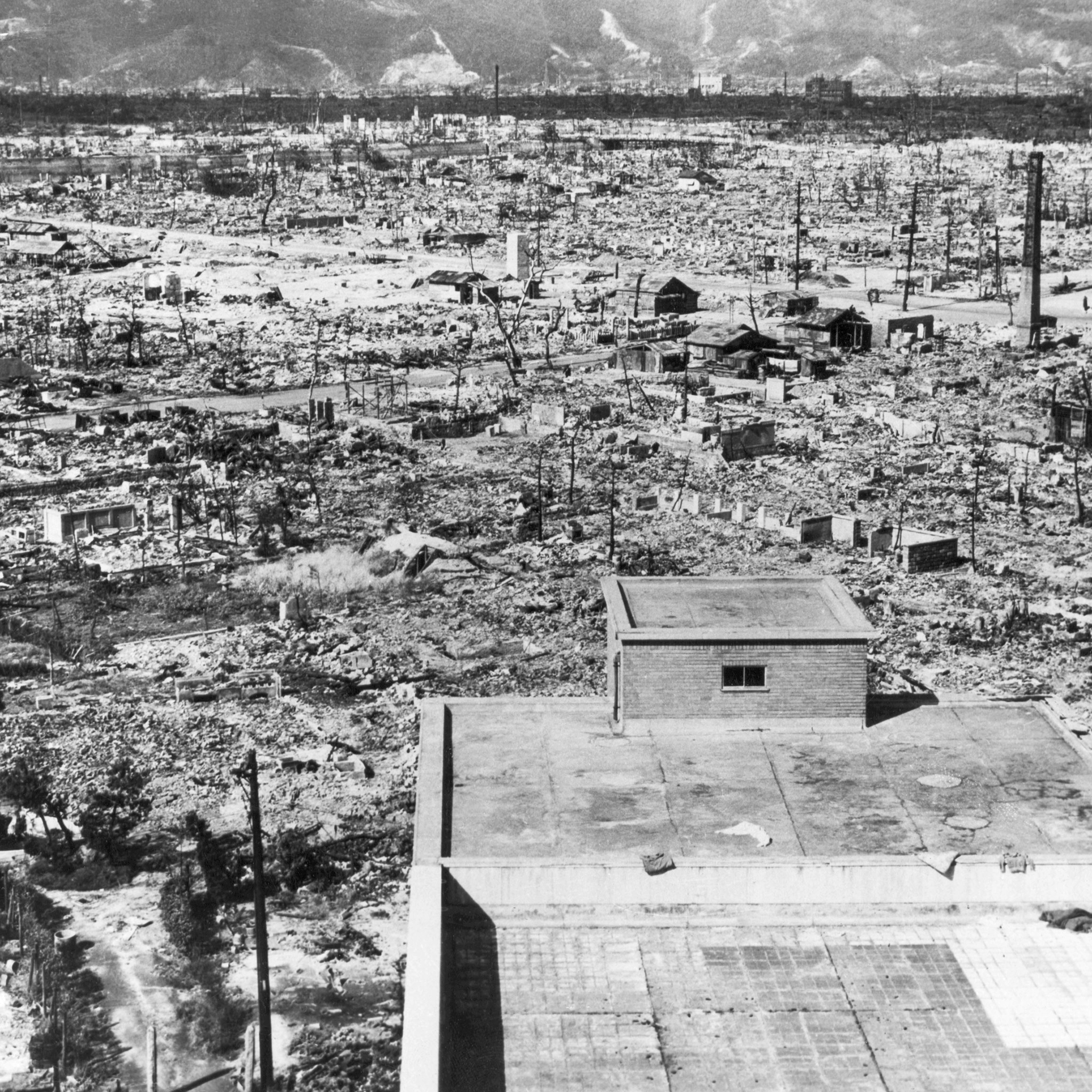
Weapon effects – Hiroshima in ruins after the Little Boy atomic bomb exploded

Initially the Manhattan Project gun-type effort was directed at making a gun weapon that used plutonium as its source of fissile material, known as the "Thin Man" because of its extreme length. It was thought that if a plutonium gun-type bomb could be created, then the uranium gun-type bomb would be very easy to make by comparison. However, it was discovered in April 1944 that reactor-bred plutonium (Pu-239) is contaminated with another isotope of plutonium, Pu-240, which increases the material's spontaneous neutron-release rate, making pre-detonation inevitable. For this reason, a gun-type bomb is thought to only be usable with enriched uranium fuel. It is unknown though possible to make a composite design using high grade plutonium in the bullet only.

After it was discovered that the "Thin Man" program would not be successful, Los Alamos redirected its efforts into creating the implosion-type plutonium weapon: "Fat Man". The gun program switched completely over to developing a uranium bomb.

Although in Little Boy 132 pounds (60 kg) of 80%-grade ^{235}U was used (hence 106 pounds or 48 kilograms), the minimum is about 44 to 55 pounds (20 to 25 kg), versus 33 pounds (15 kg) for the implosion method.

Little Boy's target subcritical mass was enclosed in a neutron reflector made of tungsten carbide (WC). The presence of a neutron reflector reduced neutron losses during the chain reaction, and so reduced the quantity of uranium fuel needed. A more effective reflector material would be metallic beryllium, but this was not known until the postwar years when Ted Taylor developed an implosion design known as "Scorpion".

The scientists who designed the "Little Boy" weapon were confident enough of its success that they did not field-test a design before using it in war (though scientists such as Louis Slotin did perform non-destructive tests with sub-critical assemblies, dangerous experiments nicknamed "tickling the dragon's tail"). In any event, it could not be tested before being deployed, as there was only sufficient U-235 available for one device. Even though the design was never proof-tested, there was thought to be no risk of the device being captured by an enemy if it malfunctioned. Even a "fizzle" would have completely disintegrated the device, while the multiple redundancies built into the "Little Boy" design meant there was negligible, if any, potential for the device to strike the ground without detonating at all.

For a quick start of the chain reaction at the right moment a neutron trigger/initiator is used. An initiator is not strictly necessary for an effective gun design, as long as the design uses "target capture" (in essence, ensuring that the two subcritical masses, once fired together, cannot come apart until they explode). Considering the 70 spontaneous fissions per second, this only causes a delay of a few times 1/70 second, which in this case does not matter. Initiators were only added to Little Boy late in its design.

== Proliferation and terrorism ==
With regard to the risk of proliferation and use by terrorists, the relatively simple design is a concern, as it does not require as much fine engineering or manufacturing as other methods. With enough highly enriched uranium, nations or groups with relatively low levels of technological sophistication could create an inefficient—though still quite powerful—gun-type nuclear weapon.

== Comparison with the implosion method ==
Schematic of the gun-type method (above) and the implosion-type method (below).

For technologically advanced states the gun-type method is now essentially obsolete, for reasons of efficiency and safety (discussed below). The gun type method was largely abandoned by the United States as soon as the implosion technique was perfected, though it was retained in the specialised role of nuclear artillery for a time. Other nuclear powers, such as the United Kingdom and Soviet Union, never built an example of this type of weapon. Besides requiring the use of highly enriched U-235, the technique has other severe limitations. The implosion technique is much better suited to the various methods employed to reduce the mass of the weapon and increase the proportion of material which fissions. Apartheid South Africa built around five gun-type weapons, and no implosion-type weapons. They later abandoned their nuclear weapon program altogether. They were unique in their abandonment of nuclear weapons, and probably also by building gun-type weapons rather than implosion-type weapons.

There are also safety problems with gun-type weapons. For example, it is inherently dangerous to have a weapon containing a quantity and shape of fissile material that can form a critical mass through a relatively simple accident. Furthermore, if the weapon is dropped from an aircraft into the sea, then the moderating effect of the seawater can also cause a criticality accident without the weapon even being physically damaged. Neither can happen with an implosion-type weapon, since there is normally insufficient fissile material to form a critical mass without the correct detonation of the explosive lenses.

== US nuclear artillery ==
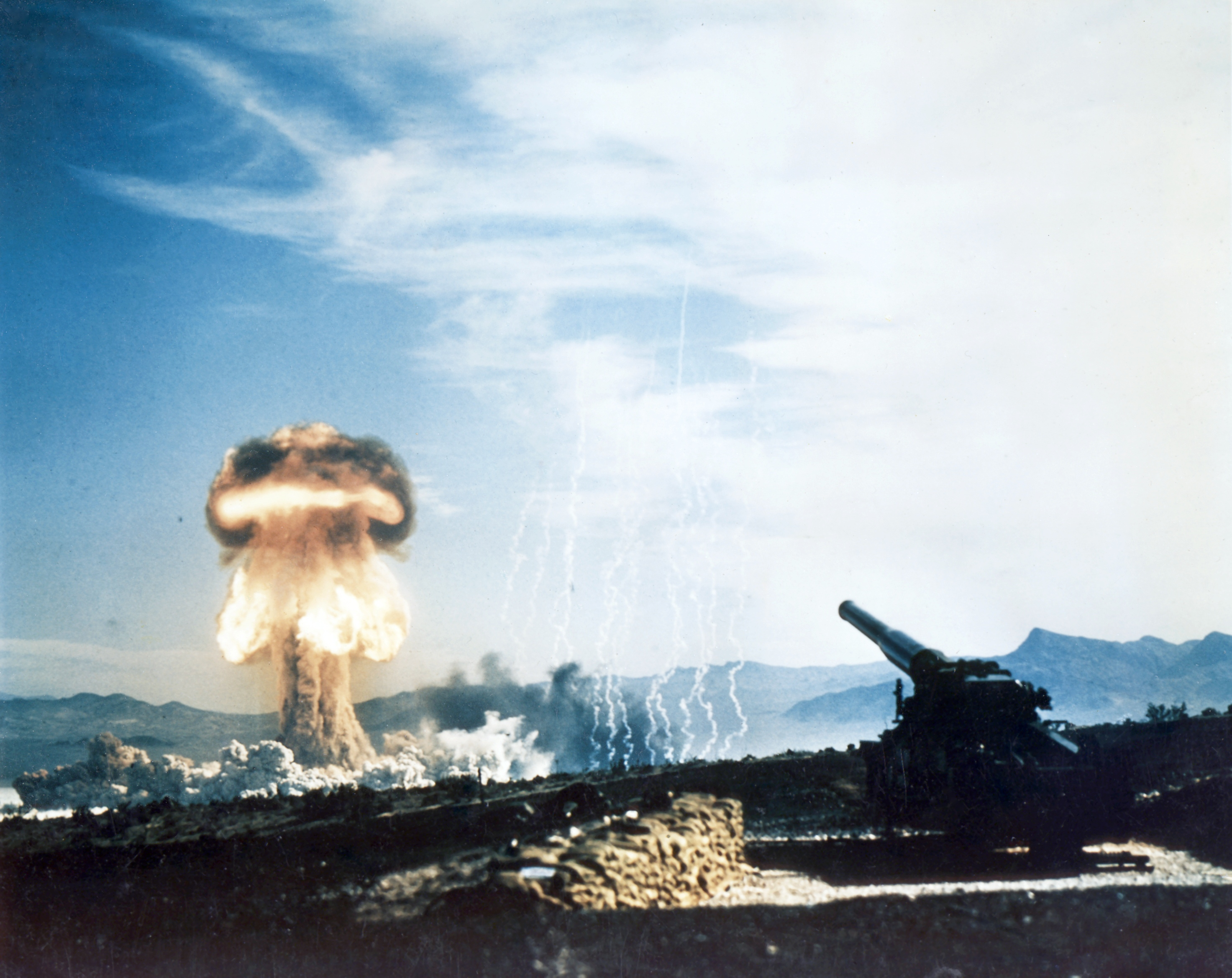
Upshot–Knothole Grable, a 1953 test of a nuclear artillery projectile at Nevada Test Site (photo depicts 280 mm gun and explosion), used a gun-type shell.

The gun method has also been applied for nuclear artillery shells, since the simpler design can be more easily engineered to withstand the rapid acceleration and g-forces imparted by an artillery gun, and since the smaller diameter of the gun-type design can be relatively easily fitted to projectiles that can be fired from existing artillery.

A US gun-type nuclear artillery weapon, the W9, was tested on May 25, 1953, at the Nevada Test Site. Fired as part of Operation Upshot–Knothole and codenamed Shot GRABLE, a 280 mm (11 in) shell was fired 10,000 m (33,000 ft) and detonated 160 m (520 ft) above the ground with an estimated yield of 15 kilotons. This is approximately the same yield as Little Boy, although the W9 had less than 1/10 of Little Boy's weight (365 kg vs. 4,000 kg, or 805 lbs vs. 8,819 lbs). The shell was 1,384 mm (54.5 in) long.

This was the only nuclear artillery shell ever actually fired (from an artillery gun) in the US test program. It was fired from a specially built artillery piece, nicknamed Atomic Annie. Eighty shells were produced from 1952 to 1953. It was retired in 1957.

The W19 was also a 280 mm gun-type nuclear shell, a longer version of the W-9. Eighty warheads were produced and the system was retired in 1963.

The W33 was a smaller, 8 inch (203 mm) gun-type nuclear artillery shell, which was produced starting in 1957 and in service until 1992. Two were test fired (detonated, not fired from an artillery gun), one hung under a balloon in the open air, and one in a tunnel.

Later versions were based on the implosion design.

== List of US gun-type weapons ==
=== Bombs ===
- Mark 1 "Little Boy", 1945–1951
- Mark 2 "Thin Man", cancelled 1944
- Mark 8 (bunker buster), 1952–1957
- Mark 10, cancelled 1952
- Mark 11 (bunker buster), 1956–1960

=== Artillery ===
- W9, 1952–1957
- W19, 1955–1963
- W23, 1956–1962
- W33, 1957–1992

=== Others ===
- T-4 Atomic Demolition Munition, 1957–1963
- W8 for the SSM-N-8 Regulus cruise missile, cancelled 1955

== Tests ==
Gun-type weapons have only been tested three times, excluding the Mark 1 used in the attack on Hiroshima.

Operation	Shot (Note: The US, France and Great Britain have code-named their test events, while the USSR and China did not, and therefore have only test numbers (with some exceptions – Soviet peaceful explosions were named). Word translations into English in parentheses unless the name is a proper noun. A dash followed by a number indicates a member of a salvo event. The US also sometimes named the individual explosions in such a salvo test, which results in "name1 – 1(with name2)". If test is canceled or aborted, then the row data like date and location discloses the intended plans, where known.)	Date time (UT)	Local time zone (Note: To convert the UT time into standard local, add the number of hours in parentheses to the UT time; for local daylight saving time, add one additional hour. If the result is earlier than 00:00, add 24 hours and subtract 1 from the day; if it is 24:00 or later, subtract 24 hours and add 1 to the day. Historical time zone data obtained from the IANA time zone database.)	Location (Note: Rough place name and a latitude/longitude reference; for rocket-carried tests, the launch location is specified before the detonation location, if known. Some locations are extremely accurate; others (like airdrops and space blasts) may be quite inaccurate. "~" indicates a likely pro-forma rough location, shared with other tests in that same area.)	Elevation + height (Note: Elevation is the ground level at the point directly below the explosion relative to sea level; height is the additional distance added or subtracted by tower, balloon, shaft, tunnel, air drop or other contrivance. For rocket bursts the ground level is "N/A". In some cases it is not clear if the height is absolute or relative to ground, for example, Plumbbob/John. No number or units indicates the value is unknown, while "0" means zero. Sorting on this column is by elevation and height added together.)	Delivery (Note: Atmospheric, airdrop, balloon, gun, cruise missile, rocket, surface, tower, and barge are all disallowed by the Partial Nuclear Test Ban Treaty. Sealed shaft and tunnel are underground, and remained useful under the PTBT. Intentional cratering tests are borderline; they occurred under the treaty, were sometimes protested, and generally overlooked if the test was declared to be a peaceful use.) Purpose (Note: Include weapons development, weapon effects, safety test, transport safety test, war, science, joint verification and industrial/peaceful, which may be further broken down.)	Device (Note: Designations for test items where known, "?" indicates some uncertainty about the preceding value, nicknames for particular devices in quotes. This category of information is often not officially disclosed.)	Yield (Note: Estimated energy yield in tons, kilotons, and megatons. A ton of TNT equivalent is defined as 4.184 gigajoules (1 gigacalorie).)	Fallout (Note: Radioactive emission to the atmosphere aside from prompt neutrons, where known. The measured species is only iodine-131 if mentioned, otherwise it is all species. No entry means unknown, probably none if underground and "all" if not; otherwise notation for whether measured on the site only or off the site, where known, and the measured amount of radioactivity released.)	References	Notes
Upshot–Knothole	Grable	May 25, 1953 15:30:00.3	PST (-8 hrs)	Launch from NTS Areas 5, 11, Frenchman Flat: 5 36.70428°N 115.97387°W, elv: 950 + 5 m (3,117 + 16 ft); Detonation over NTS 36.793°N 115.9156°W	960 m (3,150 ft) + 160 m (520 ft)	gun deployed, weapon effect	W9 AFAP "Gun"	15 kt	I-131 detected, 2.1 MCi (78 PBq)		Fired from the M65 Atomic Cannon "Atomic Annie" 11 km (6.8 mi) downrange. 280mm shell, 365 kg (805 lb). Detonation at 200 feet (61 m) SW of target. Desert Rock V military exercise in nuclear battlefield conditions. Major effects test.
Plumbbob	Laplace	September 8, 1957 12:59:59.8	PST (-8 hrs)	NTS Area B7b ~ 37.0866°N 116.0245°W	1,282 m (4,206 ft) + 230 m (750 ft)	balloon, weapons development	XW-33 "Fleegle"	1 kt	I-131 venting detected, 140 kCi (5,200 TBq)		For nuclear artillery shell.
Nougat	Aardvark	May 12, 1962 19:00:00.1	PST (-8 hrs)	NTS Area U3am(s) 37.06512°N 116.03092°W	1,214 m (3,983 ft) - 434.04 m (1,424.0 ft)	underground shaft, weapons development	TX-33Y2 AFAP{	40 kt	Venting detected on site, less than 10 Ci (370 GBq)		For nuclear artillery shell, likely boosted fission weapon.
