= Samuel Feltman =

American ballistics expert and computer scientist (1899–1951)

Samuel Feltman (May 4, 1899 – September 6, 1951) was an American computer scientist and expert in weaponry. At the time of his death, Feltman was Associate Chief of the Research and Materials Branch and Chief of the Ballistic Section of the U.S. Army Ordnance Research and Development Division.

Feltman was centrally involved in the development of the first electronic computer, ENIAC, of the hypersonic wind tunnel, and of "Atomic Annie", the first nuclear artillery shell. Feltman proposed the ballistic characteristics of such weapons as the 90mm and 120mm antiaircraft guns, the 8‑inch gun, the 240mm howitzer, and many other weapons. In 1944, he was awarded the Decoration for Exceptional Civilian Service, the highest award given by the Army to a civilian. In honor of his service and contributions, the Picatinny Arsenal dedicated a building in his name, "The Samuel Feltman Ammunition Laboratory," Picatinny Arsenal, Dover, New Jersey.

Feltman was born and raised in Long Branch, New Jersey, the son of Russian Jews. He joined the Army Ordnance Corps at the Sandy Hook Proving Ground in 1918, and served at the Aberdeen Proving Ground in Maryland. He also spent time serving as "what amounted to the permanent under-chief of the ballistics work in Washington" (D.C.). Feltman was killed at the age of 52 in an auto accident, along with his wife and father-in-law.

== Development of the computer ==
In 1946, John Mauchly and J. Presper Eckert developed the first electronic computer at the University of Pennsylvania. The funding for this computer, called ENIAC (Electrical Numerical Integrator And Calculator), was provided by the Ballistics and Ordnance Division of the U.S. Army. Lieutenant Herman Goldstine was the Army Officer most directly involved in the development of ENIAC. In his memoir/history of the development of the computer, Goldstine quotes his superior officer, Colonel Paul Gillon, who attributes a crucial role for Feltman in securing the funding for the ENIAC project. Feltman also served as a liaison between the Ballistics Division and Mauchly.

== M65 atomic cannon ==
Feltman also played an important role in the development of the M65 atomic cannon—nicknamed "Atomic Annie". Robert Schwartz began the design of a small tactical nuclear weapon at the Pentagon in 1949. Eventually, his project was transferred to the Picatinny Arsenal in Dover, New Jersey. Schwartz finished his design, and Feltman took on the important role of selling the project to the Pentagon.

In July 1954, the Technical Division Laboratory at the Picatinny Arsenal was renamed the Samuel Feltman Laboratories.
