= Economists for Peace and Security =

Economists for Peace and Security (EPS) is a New York–based, United Nations accredited and registered global organization and network of thought-leading economists, political scientists, and security experts founded in 1989 that promotes non-military solutions to world challenges, and more broadly, works towards freedom from fear and freedom from want for all.

Since 1995 EPS has been registered with the United Nations Economic and Social Council and the United Nations Department of Public Information. Since 2006 the UK branch of EPS publishes a peer reviewed journal, the Economists for Peace and Security Journal (EPSJ).

In 1995 EPS was involved with criticism of the United States Navy in Vieques, Puerto Rico, producing several reports on the subject.

Notable trustees of EPS include Kenneth Arrow and Lawrence Klein (founding trustees); Amartya Sen, Joseph Stiglitz, Robert Reich and Óscar Arias. James K. Galbraith was named Chair of the Board of Directors in 1996. Linda Bilmes was named Co-chair of the Board in 2020. Beginning in 2005, Bilmes and Trustee Joseph Stiglitz drew attention to the economic costs of the US wars in Iraq and Afghanistan at EPS sponsored panels of the American Economic Association.

In June 2017, EPS co hosted a conference in Brussels on NATO and the future of the transatlantic defense partnership with the Royal Military Academy of Belgium, which emphasized discussion on the geostrategic changes and economic trends in global defense. Topics included regional security, economics of security, globalization and global security, economics of conflict and war, economics of the arms trade, arms races and alliances, and the economics of terrorism.

== History and background ==
Inspired by International Physicians for the Prevention of Nuclear War, it was founded in 1989 as Economists Against the Arms Race (ECAAR), before becoming Economists Allied for Arms Reduction (ECAAR) in 1993. It adopted its present name in 2005. Stockbroker Robert J. Schwartz led its creation.

== Public figures and prominent members ==
The Economists for Peace and Security Board of Trustees has seventeen Nobel peace prize laureates in the prize for economics, including Joseph Stiglitz, Amartya Sen of Harvard University, Lawrence Klein, Óscar Arias, George Akerlof, Kenneth Arrow, Daniel McFadden, Roger Myerson, Thomas Schelling, William F. Sharpe of Stanford University, Robert Solow, Franco Modigliani of Massachusetts Institute of Technology, Sir Clive Granger, Wassily Leontief, Douglass North, Jan Tinbergen, and James Tobin of Harvard University and Yale University.

Other notable trustees include Former US Secretary of Labor Robert Reich, Former Prime Minister of Greece George Papandreou, Former US Secretary of Defense Robert McNamara.

== Publications ==
- ECAAR Review 2003: conflict or development?, Economists Allied for Arms Reduction, 2003, ISBN 0-9727838-0-6
- Walter Isard, Charles H. Anderton (1992), Economics of arms reduction and the peace process: contributions from peace economics and peace science, North-Holland, ISBN 978-0-444-88848-8 – book jointly sponsored with the Peace Society
