= Robert Schwarz =

Robert Schwarz may refer to:

- Robert Schwarz Strauss (1918-2014), American politician
- Robert Schwarz (translator) (1932–2003), Albanian translator also known as Robert Shvarc
- Bob Schwarz, American television director
- K. Robert Schwarz (1957–1999), American freelance music journalist on Radio Rewrite

== See also ==
- Robert Schwartz (disambiguation)
