= M115 howitzer =

M115 203 mm howitzer
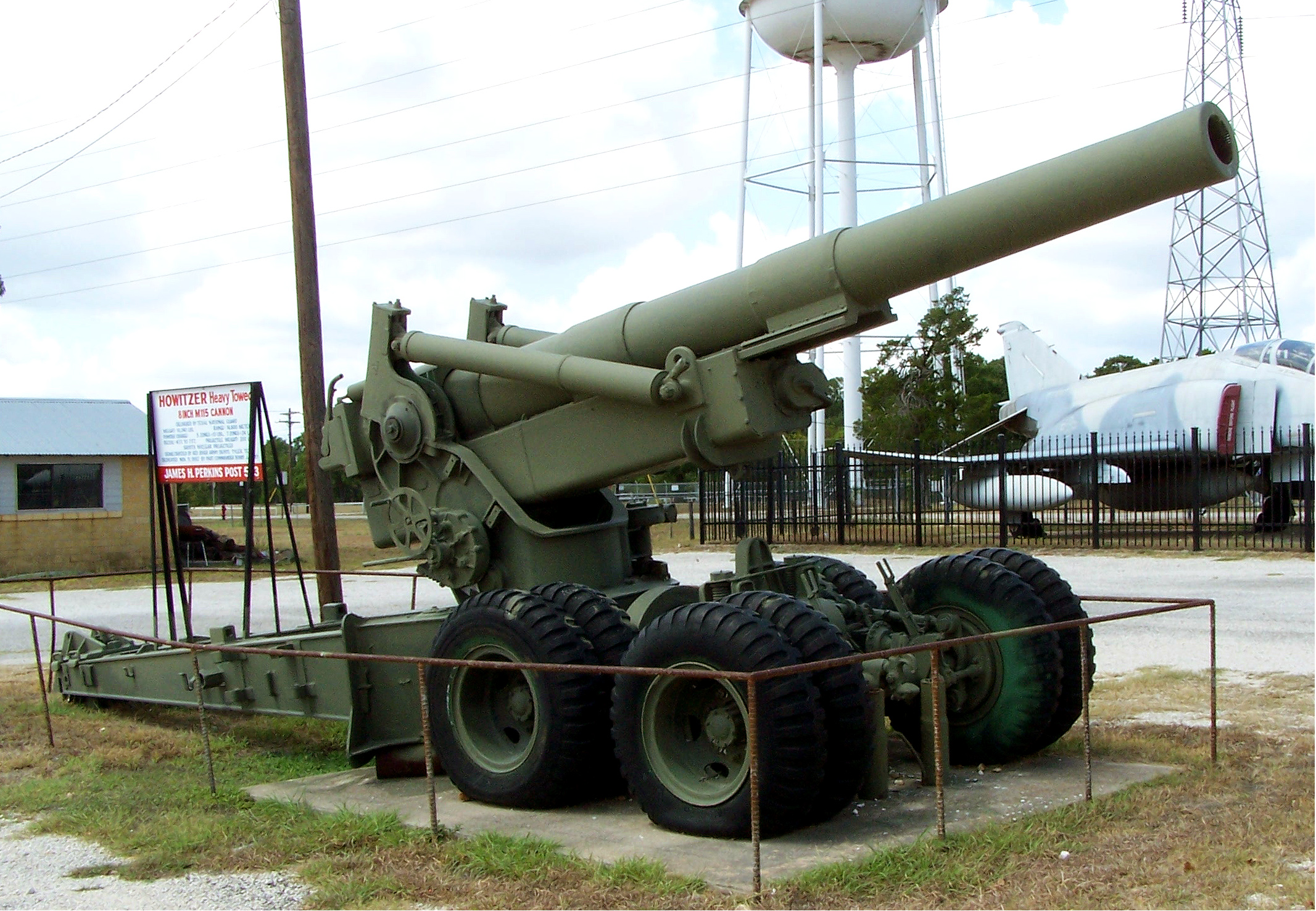
- M115 203 mm howitzer on display at Bastrop, Texas, United States.
- Type: Towed heavy howitzer
- Place of origin: United States

Service history
- In service: 1944–Present
- Wars: World War II; Korean War; Vietnam War; Iran–Iraq War; Croatian war of independence

Production history
- Designed: 1939–1940
- Produced: 1942–1945
- No. built: 1,006

Specifications
- Mass: 14,515 kg (30,000 lb)
- Length: Travel: 10.972 m (36 ft 0 in)
- Barrel length: 5.1 m (16 ft 9 in) L/25
- Width: Travel: 2.5 m (8 ft 2 in)
- Height: Travel: 2.7 m (8 ft 10 in)
- Crew: 14
- Shell: Separate loading charge and projectile
- Shell weight: 90.7 kg (200 lb)
- Caliber: 203.2 mm (8 in)
- Breech: Interrupted screw
- Recoil: Hydro-pneumatic
- Carriage: Split trail
- Elevation: −2° / +65°
- Traverse: 30°
- Rate of fire: 3 rounds/2 min (maximum for first 3 minutes); 1 round/2 min (sustained)
- Muzzle velocity: 587 m/s (1,926 ft/s)
- Effective firing range: 16,800 m (18,373 yds)
- Maximum firing range: 22,860 m (25,000 yds)

The 203 mm howitzer M115, also known as the 8-inch howitzer M115, and originally the 8-inch howitzer M1 was a towed heavy howitzer developed by the United States Army and used during World War II, the Korean War, and the Vietnam War.

Post-WWII it was also adopted by a number of other nations in Europe, the Middle East, and Asia.

== Development ==
During World War I, licensed production of the British 8-inch howitzer Mark VI was undertaken by the Midvale Steel and Ordnance Company, located in the Nicetown neighborhood of Philadelphia, Pennsylvania. Both American and British-manufactured weapons were used by the American Expeditionary Force in France. In 1940, the United States still had 475 Mark VII and Mark VIII 1/2 howitzers in storage, but there are no reports of the Mark VI or other marks being used during World War II.

The original design of the M1 8-inch howitzer started in 1919, and resulted in the M1920 howitzer, but the program lapsed until resurrected in 1927. The T2 and T3 howitzers were prototypes of a partner piece for a new 155 mm gun. The first publicity photographs of the M1-type 8-inch howitzer on its redesigned carriage appeared in 1931, but development was slowed by the Great Depression. The T3 was standardized as the 8-inch howitzer M1 in 1940.

== Design ==
Like the British 8-inch howitzer of the First World War (and most other large artillery), the M1 uses a Welin screw for its breech. The carriage was the same as used for the US 155 mm gun and was also adopted by the British for their BL 7.2-inch howitzer. It consists of a split trail with equilibrator assemblies, elevating and traversing mechanisms, a two-axle bogie with eight tires, and a single-axle, single-wheel limber for towing. Four spades, carried on the trails, were used to emplace the weapon.

== Service history ==
The M1 saw U.S. service in World War II, the Korean War, and the Vietnam War. During World War II, the M1 was towed by the Mack NO 7½ 6×6 Truck or the M4 High Speed Tractor. 59 battalions were raised during the war, of which 39 saw combat service in Northwest Europe or Italy and three in the Pacific.

In the late 1950s, it was adopted in small numbers by several NATO armies, to fire the W33 (M422/M422A1 shell) and later the W79 nuclear artillery shell, under the NATO nuclear sharing concept, a role which ended when the smallest types of tactical nuclear weapons were removed from service and eliminated. It was also adopted as a field weapon by a number of nations in Europe, the Middle East, and Asia and saw service in the Second Taiwan Strait Crisis and the Croatian War of Independence. In 1962, the M1 was redesignated the M115 howitzer.

== Operators ==
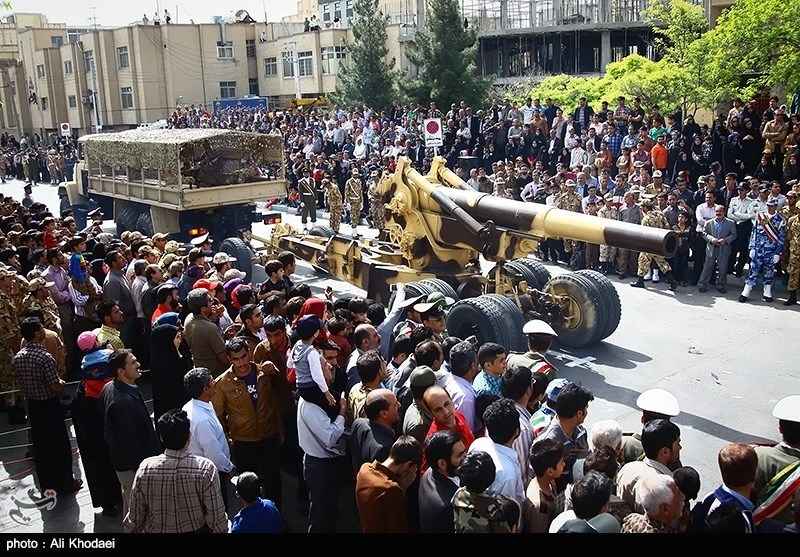
Howitzer M115 in Iran Army Day parade in Isfahan, 2014.

- Iran: 20 as of 2016
- Iraq
- Jordan: 4 in store as of 2016
- Netherlands
- Pakistan: 28 as of 2016
- Saudi Arabia: 8 in store as of 2016
- Sudan — 60 systems from Turkey
- Taiwan — 70 as of 2016
- Turkey — 162 as of 2016

=== Former operators ===
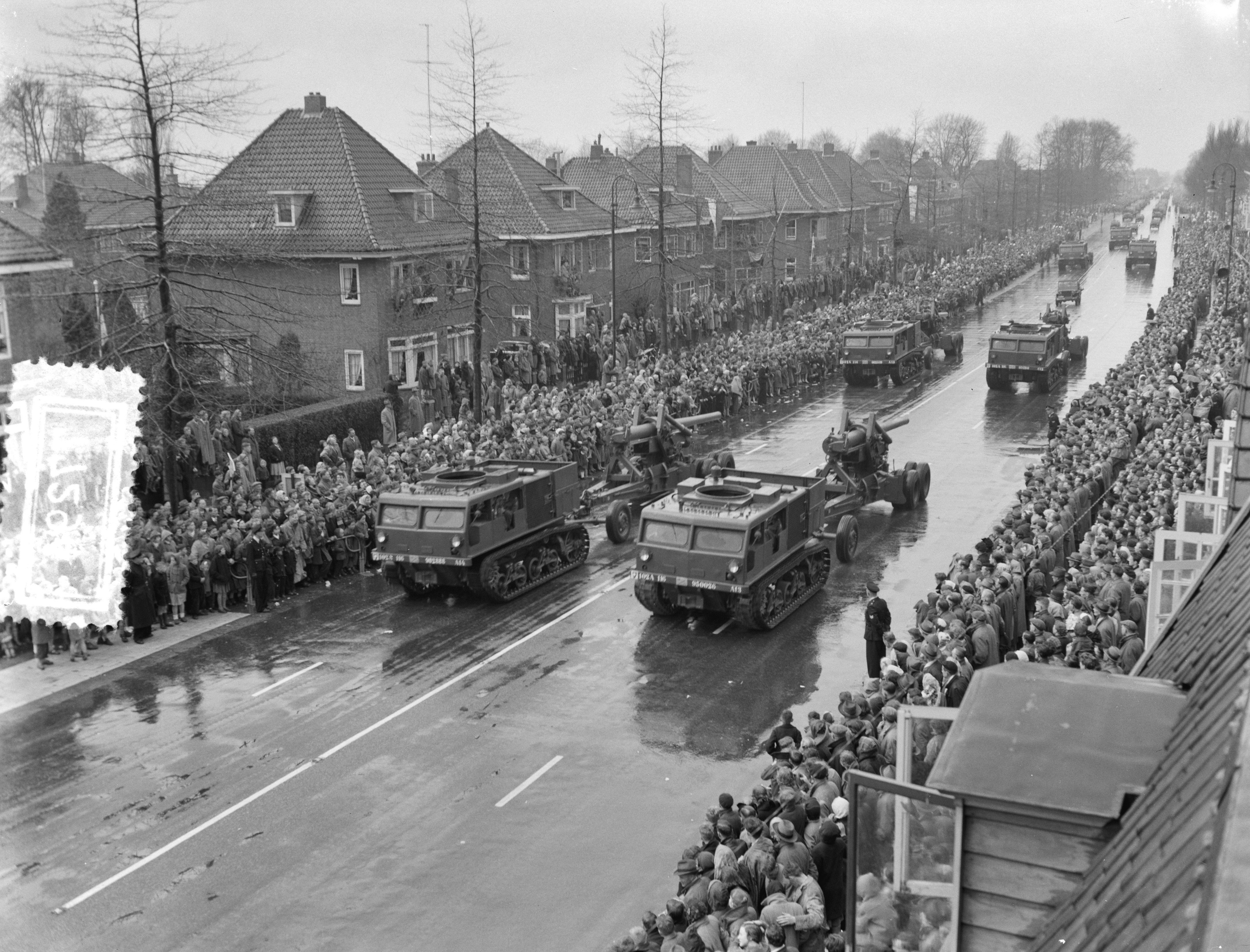
Dutch howitzers, 1956.

- Belgium — 14 systems in 1983
- Croatia: 24 systems
- Denmark — 12 systems (1953–1996)
- Greece
- Italy
- Japan
- South Korea — Acquired right after the Korean War in 1953. Began replacing in the late 2000s with the K9 Thunder.
- Spain
- West Germany
- United States

== Self-propelling mounts ==
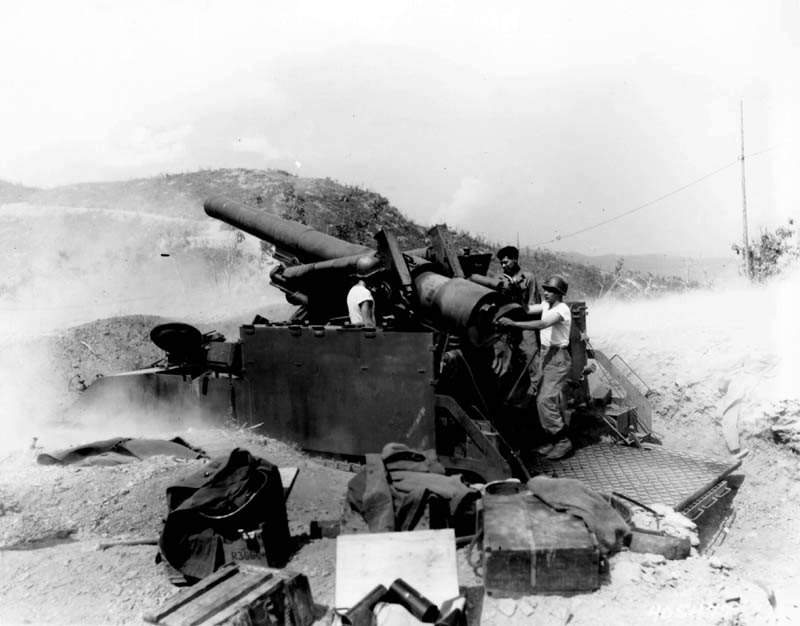
8-inch HMC M43 in Korea.

- The howitzer was mounted on a modified M4 medium tank chassis, in mount M17. The resulting vehicle was initially designated 8-inch howitzer motor carriage T89 and eventually standardized as the 8-inch howitzer motor carriage M43. A total of 48 units were built.
- 8-inch howitzer motor carriage T80 – based on T23 Medium Tank chassis, never advanced past proposal stage.
- 8-inch howitzer motor carriage T84 – based on T26 Medium Tank chassis, a single pilot was built in 1945.
- The howitzer was mounted on a purpose-built tracked chassis to become the 8-inch self-propelled howitzer M110. Notably, accuracy and rate of fire suffered from having to depress the cannon tube to loading elevation for each round in order to use the track-mounted auto loader, but the later M110A1 & M110A2 version had improved accuracy and ranges.

== Ammunition ==
The howitzer fired separate loading, bagged charge ammunition, with seven different propelling charges, from 1 (the smallest) to 7 (the largest).

Projectiles
Type	Model	Weight	Filler	Muzzle velocity	Range
HE	HE M106 Shell (charge M2)	90.7 kg (200 lb)		594 m/s (1,950 ft/s)	16,926 m (11 mi)
HE	HE Mk 1A1 Shell (charge M1)	90.7 kg (200 lb)		408 m/s (1,340 ft/s)	10,214 m (6.3 mi)
Dummy	Dummy Mk 1 Projectile		—	—	—
Nuclear	M442 (W33) nuclear shell	243 lb (110 kg)	—	547.1 m/s (1,795 ft/s)	18,000 m (11 mi)
Nuclear	XM753 (W79) nuclear shell	200 lb (91 kg)	—	601 m/s (1,970 ft/s)	24,000 m (15 mi), 30,000 m (19 mi) with rocket assist.

Propelling charges
Model	Weight, complete	Components
M1 ("green bag")	6.3 kg (13 lb 14 oz)	Five incremental charges (for charges 1 to 5)
M2 ("white bag")	13.56 kg (29 lb 14 oz)	Base charge and two incremental charges (for charges 5 to 7)
M4 (dummy)	13.04 kg (28 lb 12 oz)	Base charge and two incremental charges

Concrete penetration
Ammunition / Distance	2,743 m (3,000 yd)	4,572 m (5,000 yd)	9,144 m (10,000 yd)	13,716 m (20,000 yd)
HE M106 Shell (meet angle 0°)	1,432 mm (4 ft 8 in)	1,219 mm (4 ft)	975 mm (3 ft 2 in)	945 mm (3 ft 1 in)

== Existing examples ==
=== Netherlands ===
- Wings of Liberation Museum Park in Best (near Eindhoven), Netherlands

== See also ==
- List of U.S. Army weapons by supply catalog designation – SNL D-29

=== Equivalent artillery ===
- 203 mm howitzer M1931 (B-4) (Soviet)
- BL 7.2-inch howitzer (British)
