= Upshot–Knothole Grable =

1953 nuclear artillery test at the Nevada Test Site, United States

Information
- Country: United States
- Test series: Operation Upshot–Knothole
- Test site: Nevada Test Site
- Date: May 25, 1953
- Test type: Atmospheric
- Yield: 15 kt

Test chronology

Upshot–Knothole Grable was a nuclear weapons test conducted by the United States as part of Operation Upshot–Knothole. Detonation of the nuclear weapon, a W9 warhead, occurred 19 seconds after its deployment at 8:30am PDT (1530 UTC) on May 25, 1953, in Area 5 of the Nevada Test Site.

== Nuclear weapons test ==
The codename Grable was chosen because it is phonetic for the letter G, as in "gun", since the warhead was a gun-type bomb fired from a gun. It is also widely assumed to be an allusion to actress Betty Grable (1916–1973), a popular pin-up girl among soldiers. (Similarly, the bomb used in Operation Crossroads' first test was named "Gilda" after a character played by Rita Hayworth in the film of the same name; reportedly Hayworth was furious)

As a shell, or artillery-fired atomic projectile (AFAP), the device was the first of its kind. The test remains the only nuclear artillery shell ever actually fired in the world.

Grable was the second of only four gun-type warheads ever detonated (the first was Little Boy, the last two were test firings of the W33; all other atomic weapons were implosion-type weapons). The shell, designated a Mark 9 nuclear weapon, had a diameter of 280 mm (11.02 in), was 1380 mm (54.4 in) long and weighed 364 kg (803 lb). The M65 Atomic Cannon from which it was fired had a muzzle velocity of 625 m/s (2,060 ft/s), for a nominal range of 32 km (20 mi), and weighed 77 metric tons (85 t).

The detonation of Grable occurred 19 seconds after its firing. It detonated over 11,000 yards (over 10 km, 6.25 mi) away from the gun it was fired from, over a part of the Nevada Test Site known as Frenchman Flat. The explosion was an air burst 160 m (524 ft) above the ground (7 m (24 ft) above its designated burst altitude), 26 m (87 ft) west and 41 m (136 ft) south of its target (slightly uprange). Its yield was estimated at 15 kilotons, about the same as Little Boy. An anomalous feature of the blast was the formation of a precursor, a second shock front ahead of the incident wave. This precursor was formed when the shock wave reflected off the ground and surpassed the incident wave and Mach stem due to a heated ground air layer and the low burst height. It resulted in a lower overpressure, but higher overall dynamic pressure, which inflicted much more damage on drag sensitive targets such as jeeps and personnel carriers. This led strategists to rethink the importance of low air bursts in tactical nuclear warfare.

Some images from Upshot–Knothole Grable were accidentally relabeled as belonging to the Priscilla shot from Operation Plumbbob in 1957. As a consequence, many publications, including official government documents, have the photo mislabeled.

Admiral Arthur W. Radford, at the time the Chairman of the Joint Chiefs of Staff, and Secretary of Defense Charles E. Wilson were present for the test.

== Gallery ==
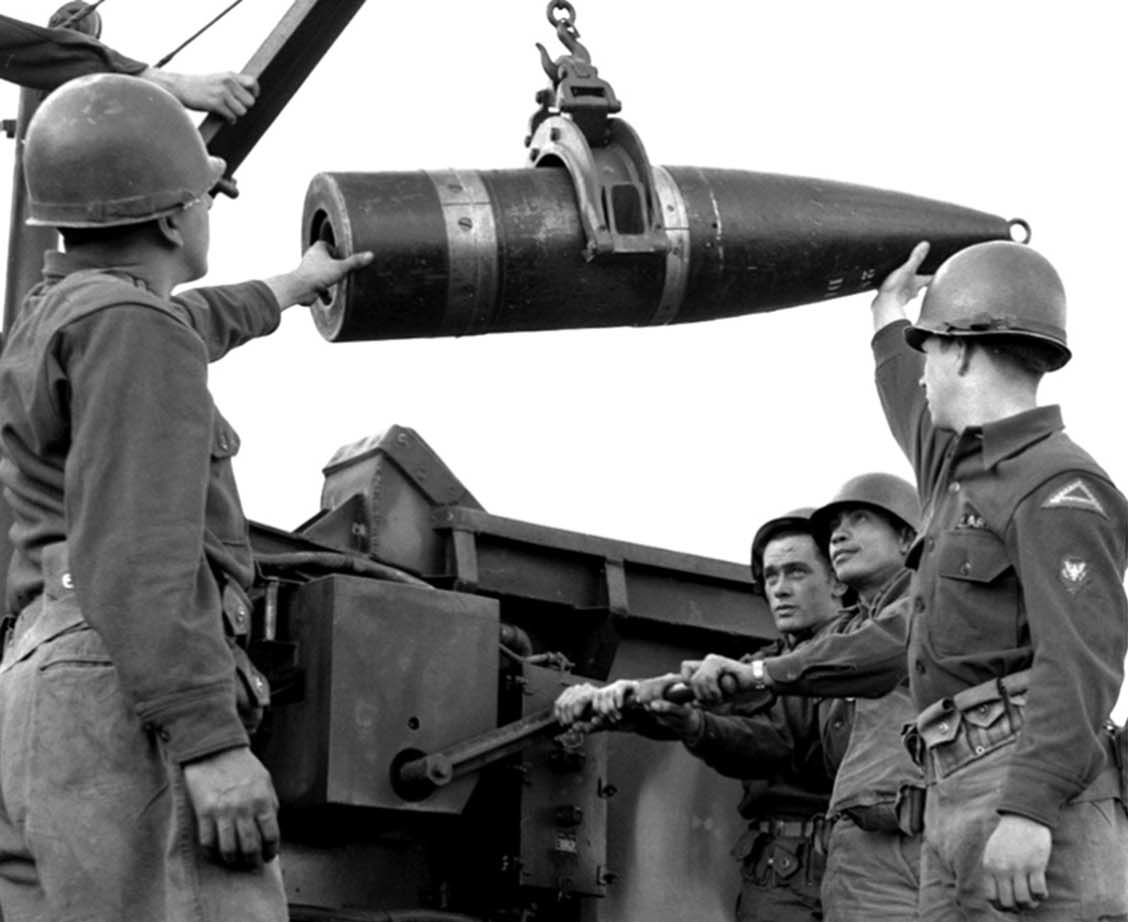
W9 280mm Artillery Fired Atomic Projectile

Full uncut detonation of Upshot Knothole Grable, launched out of the Atomic Annie device on 5/25/1953. The footage at normal speed is about 2 and a half minutes.

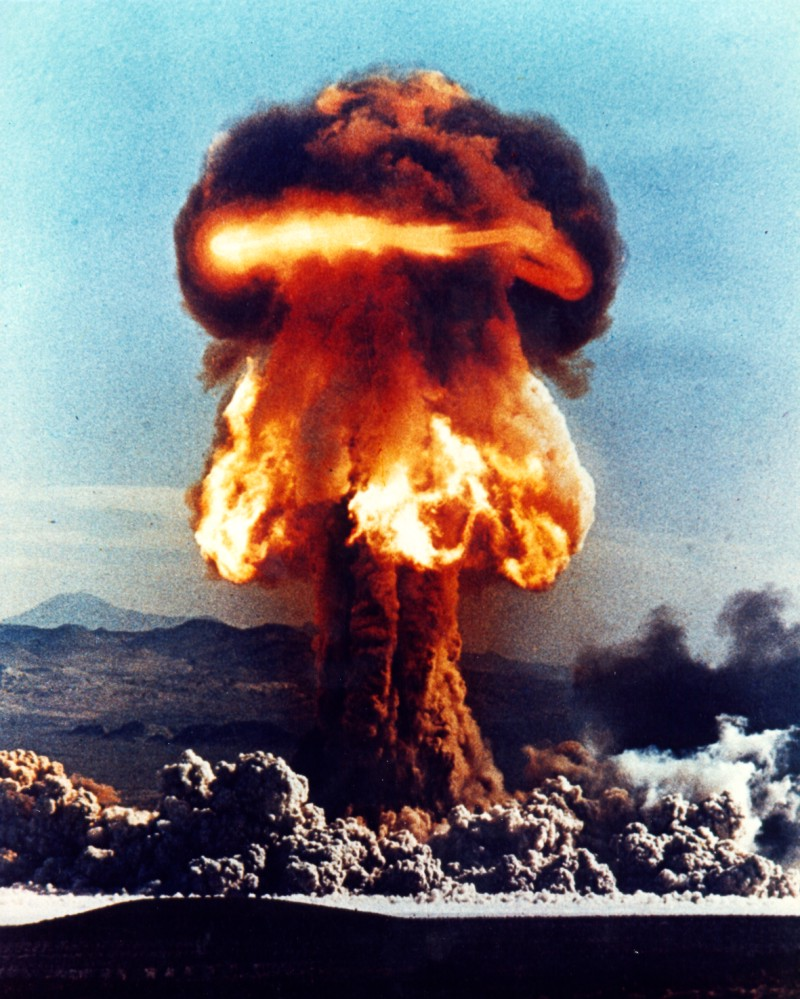
A closeup of the mushroom cloud and fireball.

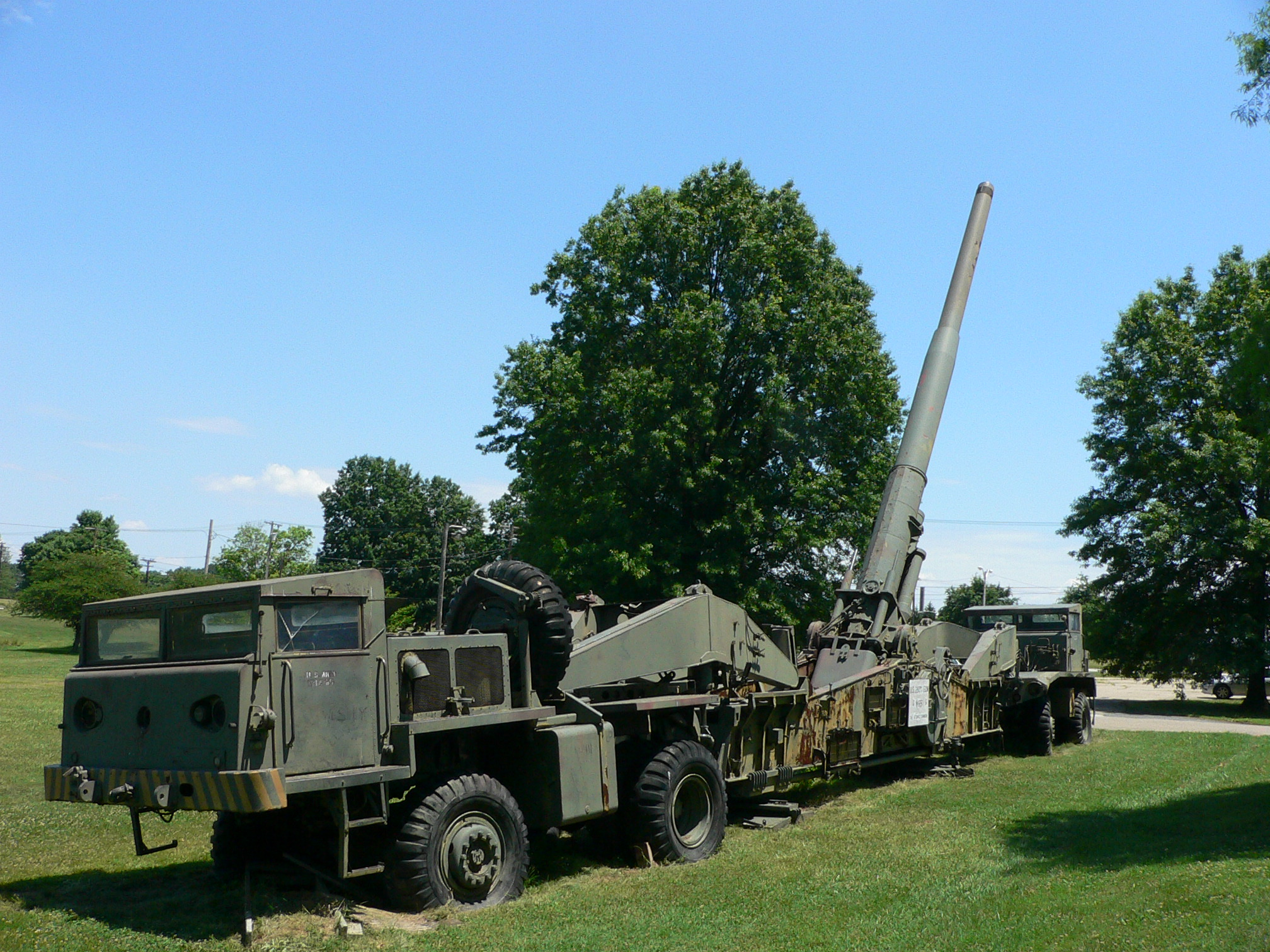
M65 Atomic Cannon.
