= W9 (nuclear warhead) =

American nuclear artillery shell (1952–1957)

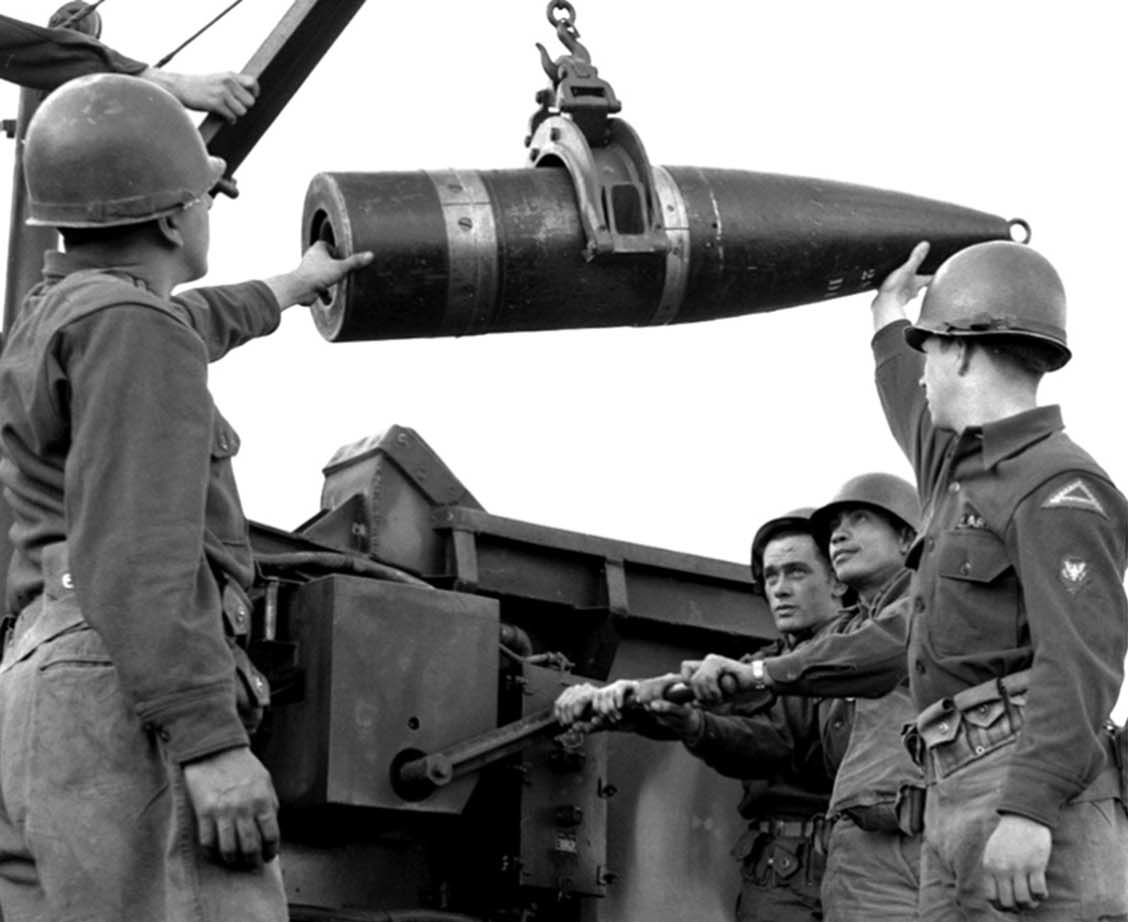
W9 280mm Artillery Fired Atomic Projectile

The W9 was an American nuclear artillery shell fired from a special 280 mm howitzer. It was produced starting in 1952 and all were retired by 1957, being superseded by the W19.

== Description ==
The W9 was 11 inches (280 mm) in diameter, 54.8 in (1,390 mm) long, and weighed 850 lb (390 kg). It had an explosive yield of 15 kt (63 TJ).

The W9 was a gun-type nuclear weapon, using around 50 kg (110 lb) of highly enriched uranium in one large ring assembly and one smaller bullet, which was fired down a tube by conventional explosives into the ring assembly to achieve critical mass and detonate the weapon.

The W9 units which were retired in 1957 were recycled into lower yield T-4 Atomic Demolition Munitions. These were the first (semi) man-portable nuclear weapons.

== Tests ==
The W9 is only the second gun-type nuclear weapon known to have been detonated; the first was the Little Boy nuclear weapon used in World War II.

The W9 artillery shell was test fired once, fired from the "Atomic Annie" M65 Atomic Cannon, in Upshot-Knothole Grable on May 25, 1953 at the NTS. Yield was the expected 15 kilotons.

Subsequently, the W33 nuclear artillery shell was test fired twice (not in a gun) during its development (shots Nougat/Aardvark and Plumbbob/Laplace). These four detonations are the only identified gun-type bomb detonations.

== Gallery ==
The W9 nuclear artillery shell was tested during the Upshot-Knothole Grable shot in 1953 with a yield of 15 kilotons, about the same strength as the Little Boy bomb dropped on Hiroshima during World War II

Full uncut detonation of Upshot Knothole Grable, launched out of the Atomic Annie device on 5/25/1953. The footage at normal speed is about 2 and a half minutes.

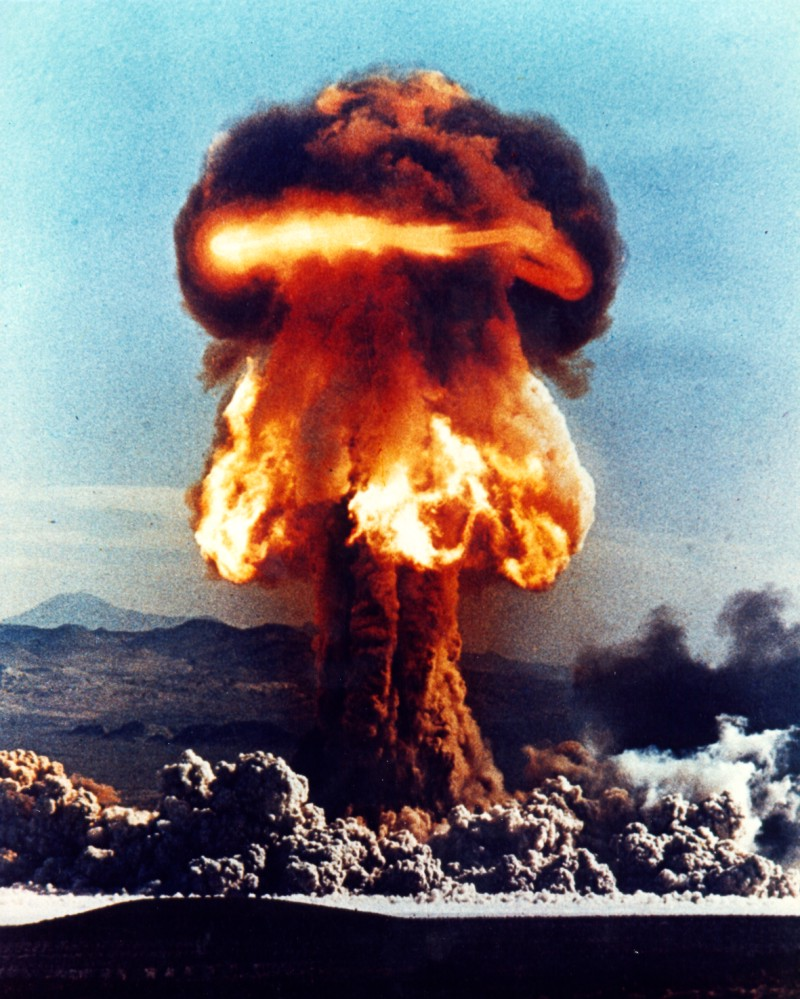
A closeup of the mushroom cloud and fireball.

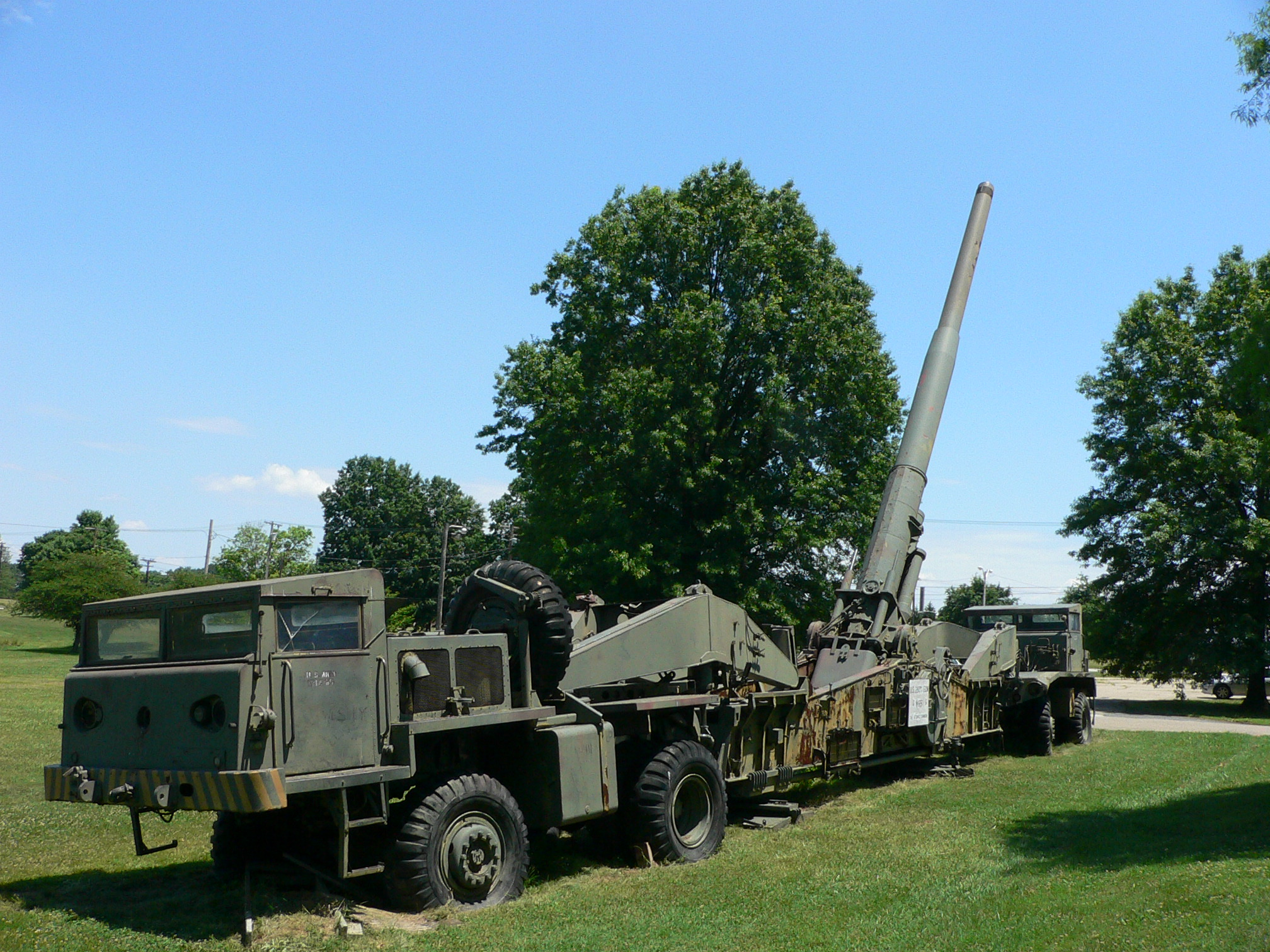
M65 Atomic Cannon; the type of artillery piece from which the projectile was test-fired.

== See also ==
- Nuclear artillery
- List of nuclear weapons
