= M65 atomic cannon =

Cold War US heavy towed nuclear howitzer

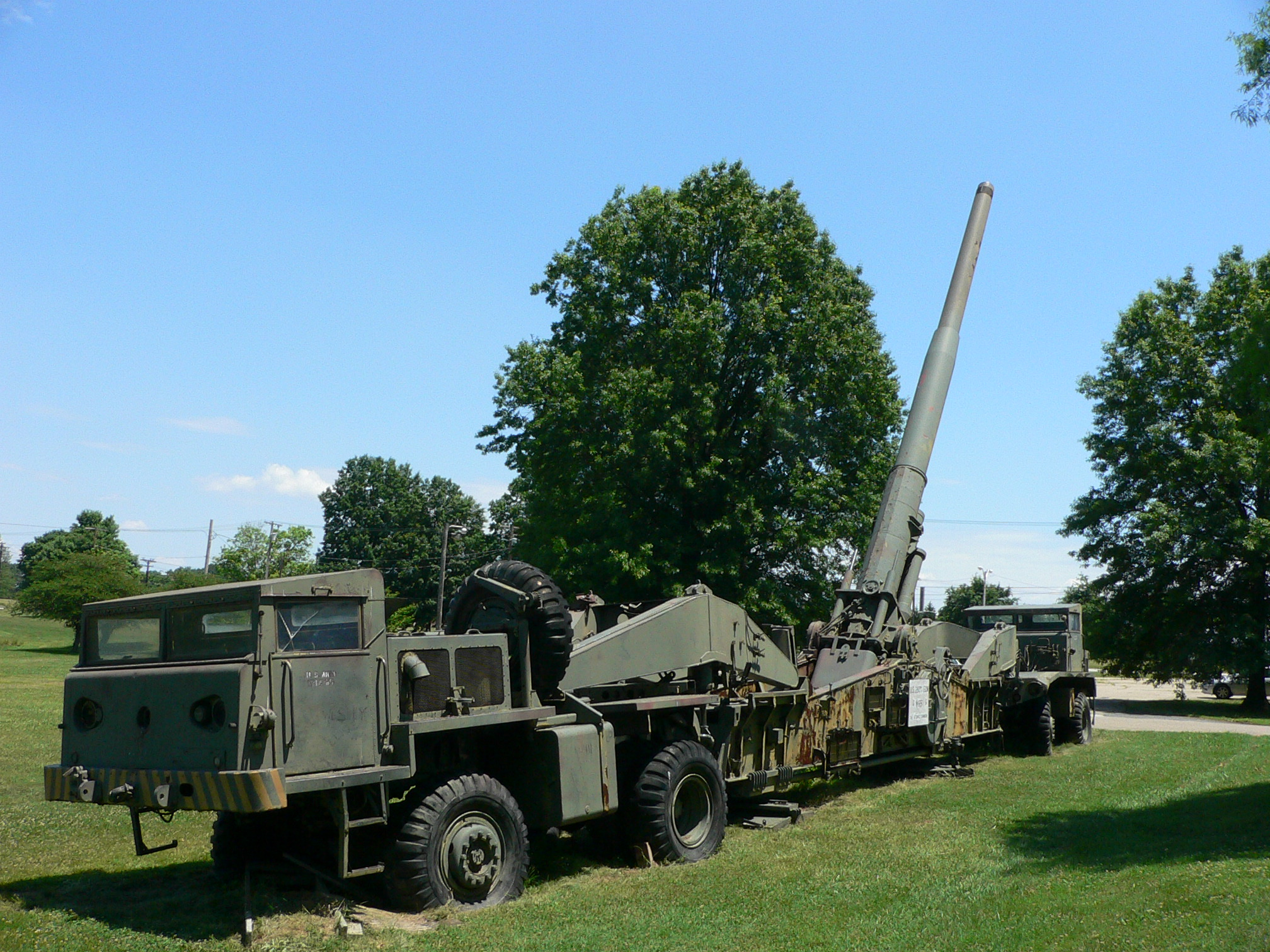
- A preserved M65 atomic cannon
- Type: Heavy towed artillery
- Place of origin: United States

Production history
- Manufacturer: Watervliet Arsenal; Watertown Arsenal

Specifications
- Mass: 172,865 lb 78,410 kg; 86.433 short tons
- Length: 85 feet (26 m)
- Width: 10 feet (3.0 m)
- Height: 12 feet 2 inches (3.71 m)
- Crew: 5–7
- Caliber: 280 millimeters (11 in)
- Breech: Welin breech block
- Recoil: hydro-pneumatic
- Carriage: double recoil, ball and socket traverse
- Elevation: 55°
- Traverse: 7.5° (fine); 360° (by moving float)
- Muzzle velocity: 2,500 feet per second (760 m/s)
- Effective firing range: approximately 20 miles (30 km)
- Main armament: W9 (nuclear warhead)

The M65 atomic cannon, often called Atomic Annie, was an artillery piece built by the United States and capable of firing a nuclear weapon, developed in the early 1950s at the beginning of the Cold War. It was fielded between April 1955 and December 1962 in West Germany with the 7th US Army, in South Korea with the 8th US Army, and on Okinawa, Japan.

== History ==
The M65 fired the W9 nuclear artillery shell, first tested during the Upshot-Knothole Grable shot in 1953, yielding 15 kilotons, about the same strength as the Little Boy bomb dropped on Hiroshima during World War II.

In 1949, Picatinny Arsenal was tasked with creating a nuclear-capable artillery piece. Robert Schwartz, the engineer who created the preliminary designs, essentially scaled up the 240 mm howitzer shell (then the maximum in the arsenal) to 280 mm and used the similarly sized German K5 railroad gun as a point of departure for the carriage. (The name Atomic Annie likely derives from the nickname Anzio Annie given to a pair of German K5 guns which were employed against the Allied landings in Italy.) The design was approved by the Pentagon, largely through the intervention of Samuel Feltman, chief of the ballistics section of the ordnance department's research and development division. A three-year developmental effort followed. The project proceeded quickly enough to produce a demonstration model to participate in Dwight D. Eisenhower's inaugural parade in January 1953. The gun was initially designated T131 and the carriage was T72.

The cannon was transported by two specially designed tractors in the same manner as railroad Schnabel cars. Both tractors were capable of independent steering in the manner of some extra-long fire trucks. Each of the tractors was rated at 375 horsepower (280 kW), and the somewhat awkward combination could achieve speeds of 35 miles per hour (56 km/h) and negotiate right-angle turns on 28-foot (8.5 m) wide paved or packed roads. The artillery piece could be unlimbered in 12 minutes, then returned to traveling configuration in another 15 minutes. The gun was deployed by lowering it from the tractors onto leveled ground. The whole gun assembly was balanced on a ball and socket joint so that it could be swung around the footplate. The traverse was limited by a curved track placed under the rear of the gun.

On 25 May 1953, at 8:30 a.m., the atomic cannon was tested at the Nevada Test Site (specifically Frenchman Flat) as part of the Upshot–Knothole series of nuclear tests. The test—codenamed "Grable"—was attended by the Chairman-delegate of the Joint Chiefs of Staff, Admiral Arthur W. Radford and United States Secretary of Defense Charles Erwin Wilson; it resulted in the successful detonation of a 15 kt (63 TJ) shell (W9 warhead) at a range of 7 miles (11 km). This was the first and only nuclear shell to be fired from a cannon. (The Little Feller 1 test shot of a W54 used a Davy Crockett weapon system, which was a recoilless smooth-bore gun firing the warhead mounted on the end of a spigot inserted in the barrel of the weapon.)

Full uncut detonation of Upshot-Knothole Grable, testing of the M65 artillery on 25 May 1953. The footage at normal speed is about 2 and a half minutes.

After the successful test, at least 20 cannons were manufactured at Watervliet and Watertown Arsenals, at a cost of US$800,000 each. The cannons weighed 83.3 tons, were 84 feet long, 16.1 feet wide, and 12.2 feet tall. Operated by a crew of 5-7 artillerymen, the cannon fired 280mm caliber shells that weighed 600 pounds and had a range of 7-20 miles. The atomic yield of the shells could be anywhere from 15-20 kilotons. They were deployed overseas to Europe and Korea, and frequently shifted around to avoid being detected and targeted by opposing forces. Due to the size of the apparatus, their limited range, the development of nuclear shells compatible with existing artillery pieces (the W48 for the 155 mm and the W33 for the 203 mm), and the development of rocket- and missile-based nuclear artillery (such as the Little John and Honest John tactical nuclear missiles), the M65 was effectively obsolete soon after it was deployed. However, it remained a prestige weapon and was not retired until 1963. In that same year, the W48 155mm nuclear artillery shell came into service with the US Army.

== Surviving units ==
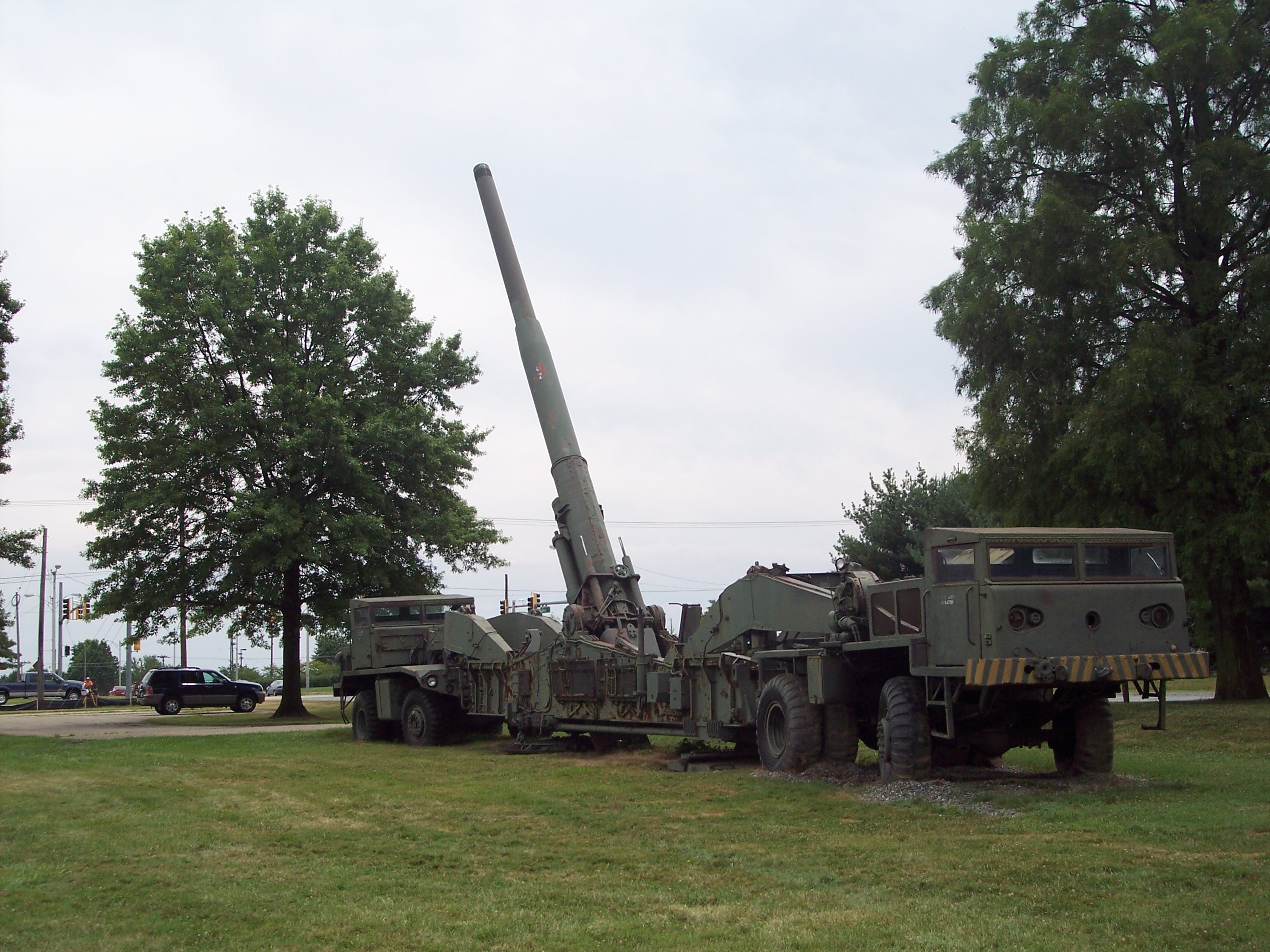
An M65 atomic cannon at Aberdeen Proving Ground

Of the twenty M65s produced, at least seven survive on display. Most no longer have their prime movers:

- U.S. Army Artillery Museum, Fort Sill, Oklahoma. This is the original Atomic Annie that fired the live nuclear shot. It was restored in 2010 and is now displayed with prime movers replacing those that were lost in an accident when the cannon was retrieved from Germany by the museum in 1964. After the initial test, it was mistakenly switched with a different cannon. The mistake was discovered 10 years later prompting a search for the original weapon. The search was concluded in 1964 when the cannon was located in West Germany; following its rediscovery, the cannon was decontaminated and underwent restoration work.
- United States Army Ordnance Training and Heritage Center, Petersburg, Virginia, with the two large prime movers attached.
- National Museum of Nuclear Science & History, Albuquerque, New Mexico, with two prime movers.
- Freedom Park, Junction City, Kansas, overlooking Fort Riley.
- Rock Island Arsenal, Memorial Field, Rock Island, Illinois.
- Watervliet Arsenal Museum, Watervliet Arsenal, Watervliet, New York, the manufacturing facility where all the pieces were all manufactured.
- Yuma Proving Ground, Yuma, Arizona.

The Virginia War Museum in Newport News, Virginia has been erroneously identified as possessing a 240 mm prototype of the M65. The weapon at the museum is actually a conventional 240 mm T1 Gun, one of two produced as part of a separate design program which was abandoned in favor of the T131 280 mm Atomic Cannon program. Both the T1 and T131/M65 share T72 carriages.

== Gallery ==
1958 deployment in Korea (film)

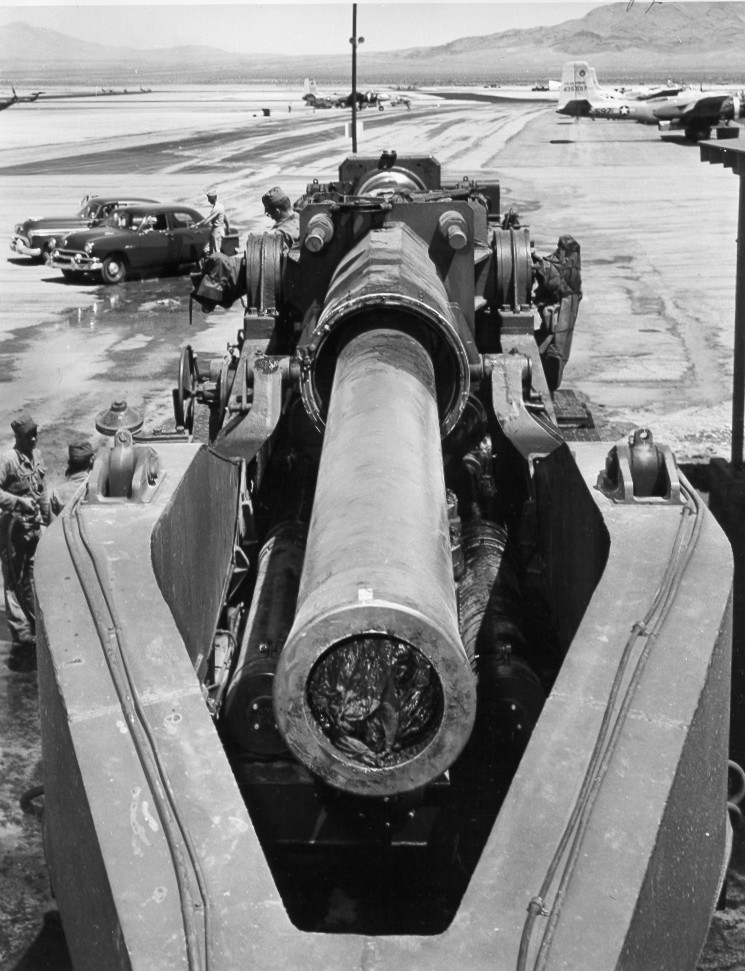
View from the front prime mover

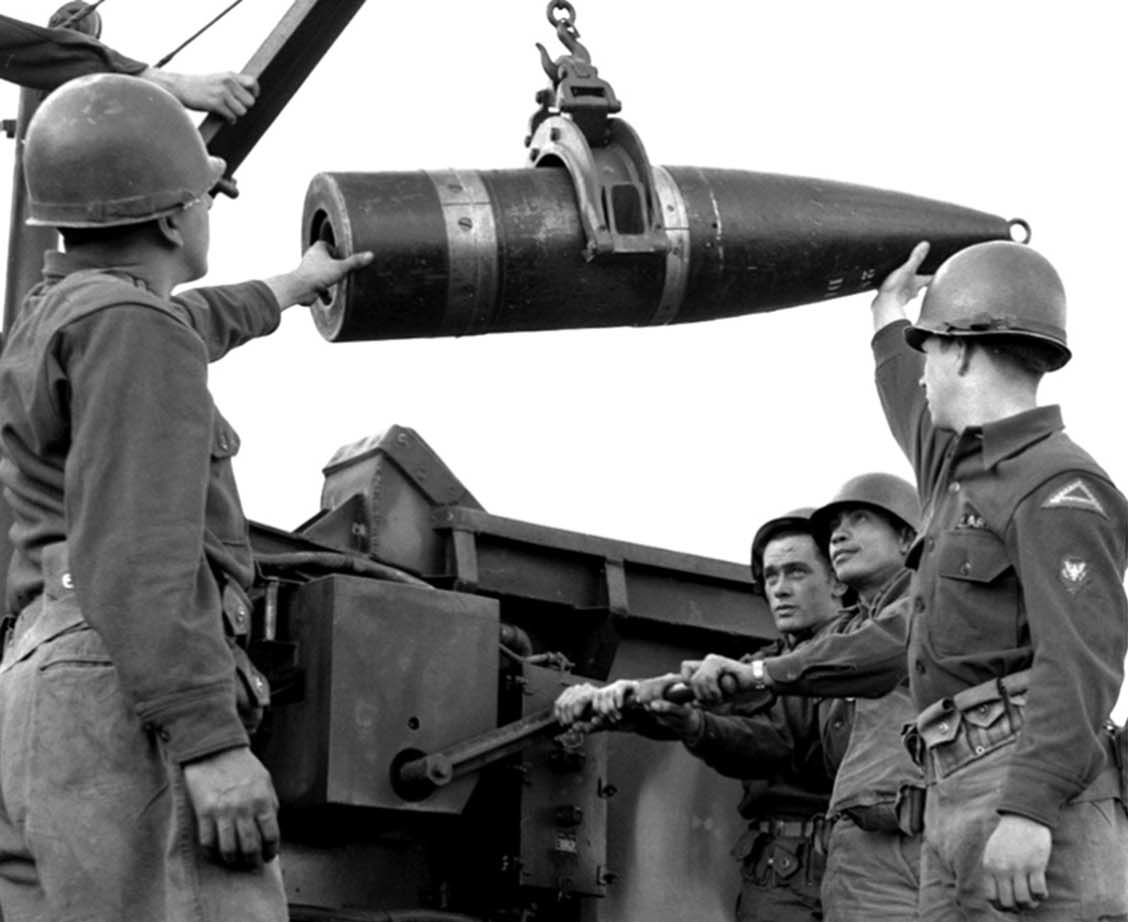
The W9 280mm nuclear artillery shell as equipped, and fired from, the M65

== See also ==
- List of U.S. Army weapons by supply catalog designation
- 2A3 Kondensator 2P
- 2B1 Oka
