= W33 (nuclear warhead) =

American nuclear artillery shell

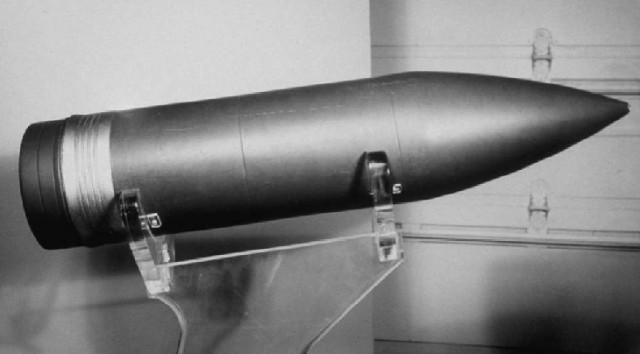
- A 203 millimetre W33 nuclear artillery shell on display
- Type: Nuclear artillery
- Place of origin: United States

Service history
- In service: 1955–1992
- Used by: United States Army

Specifications
- Mass: 243 pounds (110 kg)
- Blast yield: 5 to 40 kilotonnes of TNT (21 to 167 TJ)

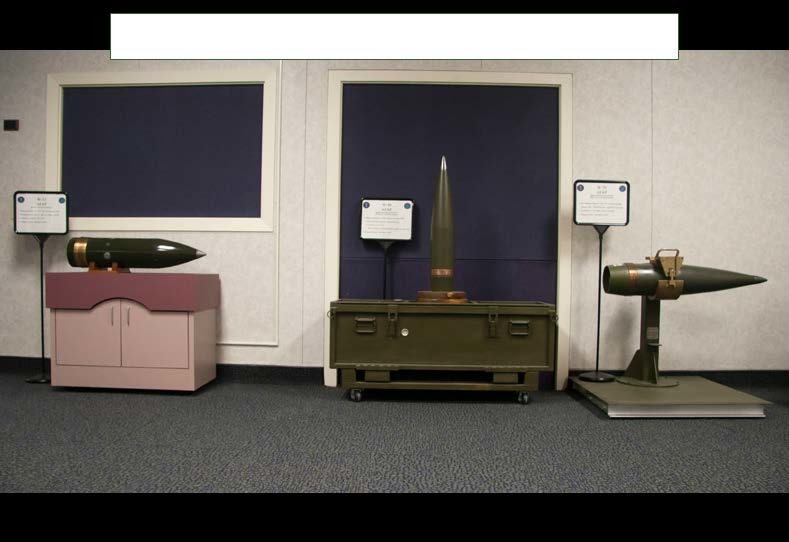
W33 AFAP on display (left)

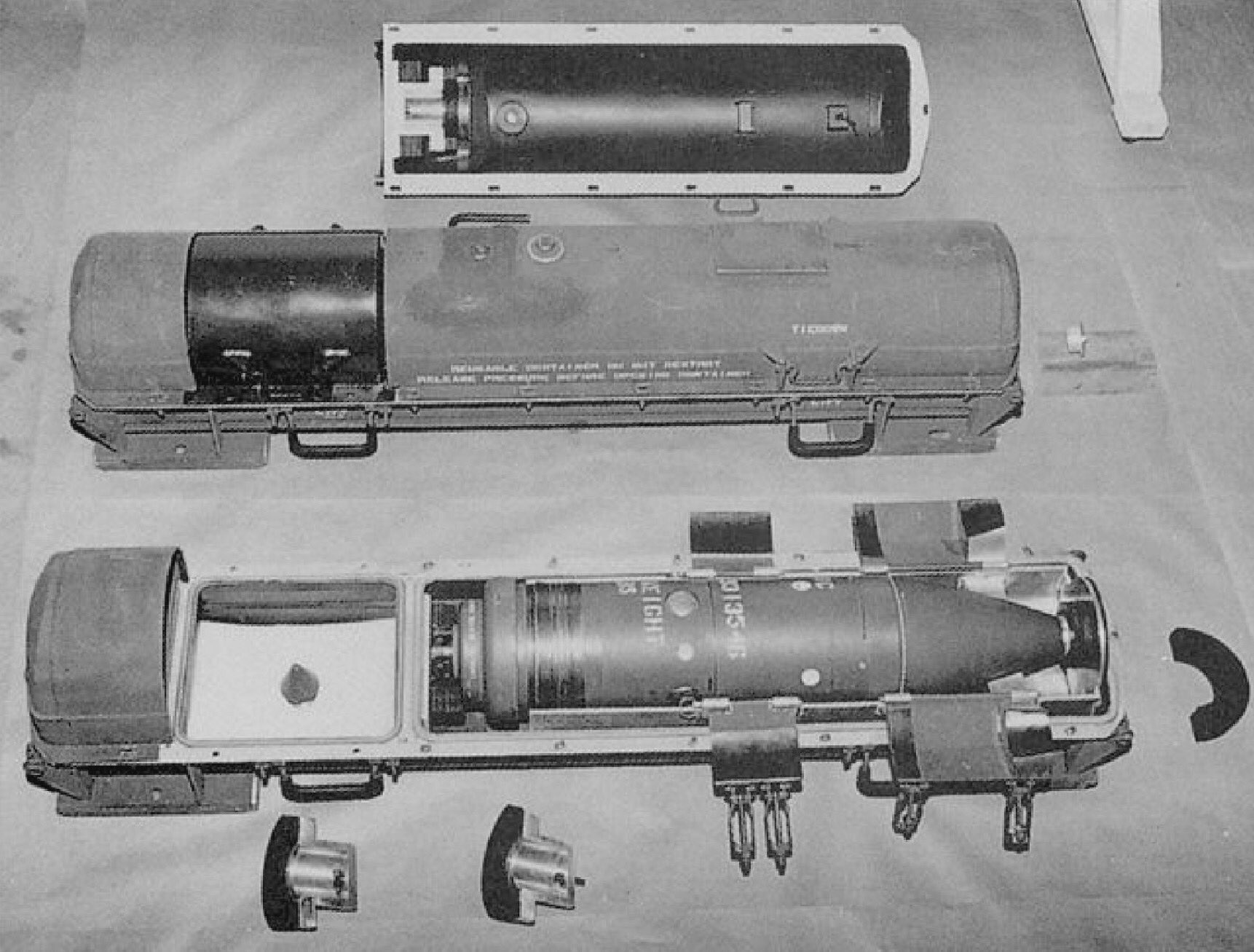
W33 (M422) nuclear artillery projectile in its storage container

The W33 (also known as the Mark 33, T317 and M422) was an American nuclear artillery shell designed for use in the 8-inch (203 mm) M110 howitzer and M115 howitzer.

A total of 2,000 W33 projectiles were produced, with the first production warheads entering the stockpile in 1957. The W33 remained in service until 1992. The warhead used enriched uranium (code named oralloy) as its nuclear fissile material and could be used in two different yield configurations. This required the assembly and insertion of different pits, with the amount of fissile materials used controlling whether the destructive yield was low or high. The highest-yield version of the W33 may have been a boosted fission weapon.

== History ==
Development of the W33 was authorized by the Army Ordnance Corps in June 1953. It was believed that a shell capable of being fired by a standard mobile field howitzer would be more effective while also providing a psychological effect in ground warfare. The design would also include consideration for being fired from navy 8-inch (203 mm) guns, and would use nuclear components from the W9 11-inch (280 mm) nuclear artillery shell.

The initial army designation for the weapon was Shell, AE, 8-inch, T317 and the Atomic Energy Commission (AEC) nomenclature was Mark 33. The army was assigned the task of designing, constructing and stockpiling the non-nuclear components of the weapon, while the AEC was assigned the design and construction of the nuclear components.

The design remained in the research and development phase until funds were assigned to the project in February 1954. In April it was decided the weapon needed to be in service by July 1955, so the program was placed on a crash basis. The first Emergency Capability (EC) weapons entered the stockpile in July 1955. Production (non-EC) weapons were produced from January 1957 to January 1965. Approximately 2000 weapons were produced and all were retired by September 1992.

== Design ==
The weapon used nuclear components from the W9 11-inch (280 mm) nuclear artillery shell, and these in turn were derived from the nuclear components in the Mark 8 nuclear bomb. From official sources, the weapon was of the gun-type design and had a range of 18 kilometres (11 mi).

Information regarding the W33 has suggested that it was either a double gun and/or that it may have used an annular barrel assembly. The device's internal mechanism was apparently code-named Fleegle. A double gun mechanism reduces the required velocity of each projectile by half, which reduces the gun system weight by a factor of 8. An annular bore may allow a larger projectile which remains subcritical by itself (a hollow projectile has lower effective density, and critical mass scales with the inverse square of density). Titanium was used to reduce weight of some components. Judging by the remaining photographic evidence, it is likely that the exterior casing of the artillery shell itself was made of titanium. This is plausible, given that the copper-alloy driving band around the base of the shell is the only part of the shell which engages with the rifling on the artillery piece's barrel.

The W33 mechanism has been reported to have comprised two critical nuclear parts which were required to assemble a complete W33 warhead. The initial disassembly of stockpiled W33 warheads in 1992 proceeded first by disassembling all existing parts for one of the components, and then disassembling the other one in following years.

The weapon had four yield variants, known as the Y1 through Y4, and written using the standard nomenclature in the form of W33Y1 etc. The yield of each type remains classified, but it has been alleged that the Y2 version had a yield of 40 kilotonnes of TNT (170 TJ) and the other versions were 5 to 10 kilotonnes of TNT (21 to 42 TJ). A declassified British document gives the maximum yield as 10 kilotonnes of TNT (42 TJ)

Use control to prevent unauthorized firing of the weapon was provided by a cover fitted to the rear of the weapon with a combination lock. The cover prevented loading of the weapon into a gun.

== Tests ==
The W33 is the third known model of gun-type fission weapons to have been detonated, and the second as a test explosion. The W33 was tested twice, first in Operation Plumbbob Laplace, on September 8, 1957 with a yield of 1 kilotonne of TNT (4.2 TJ), and the TX-33Y2 in Operation Nougat Aardvark on May 12, 1962, with a yield of 40 kilotonnes of TNT (170 TJ).

Neither test involved firing a W33 from an actual howitzer. Plumbbob Laplace was test fired with the device hanging from a balloon at an altitude of 230 metres (750 ft). Nougat Aardvark was test fired underground at a depth of 434 metres (1,424 ft).

Prior gun-type detonations were the Little Boy nuclear weapon used on Hiroshima in World War II, and a test firing of the W9 280-millimetre (11 in) nuclear artillery shell in test shot Upshot-Knothole Grable on May 25, 1953.

== See also ==
- List of nuclear weapons
- W79 Artillery-Fired Atomic Projectile
