= W19 (nuclear artillery shell) =

American shell (1955–1963)

The W19, also called Katie, was an American nuclear artillery shell, derived from the earlier W9 shell. The W19 was fired from a special 11-inch (28 cm) howitzer. It was introduced in 1955 and retired in 1963.

== Specifications ==
The W19 was 11 inches (28 cm) in diameter, 54 inches (140 cm) long, and weighed 600 pounds (270 kg). It had a yield of 15–20 kilotons and was like its predecessor the W9, a gun-type nuclear weapon.

== Variants ==
=== W23 ===
The W19 nuclear system was adapted into a nuclear artillery shell for the US Navy's 16-inch (406 mm) main battery found on the Iowa-class battleships, the W23. Production of the W23 began in 1956 and they were in service until 1962, with a total of 50 units being produced.

The W23 was 16 inches (406 mm) in diameter and 64 inches (160 cm) long, with a weight given variously as 1,500 or 1,900 pounds (680 or 860 kg) in reference sources. As with the W19, yield was 15–20 kilotons.

== See also ==
- Nuclear artillery
- List of nuclear weapons
- W9
