= Robert J. Schwartz =

American economist

Robert J. Schwartz was a US-born Economist and stock-broker (1917–2006). He was an early advocate of socially responsible investing. He also actively campaigned for civil rights, against the Vietnam War and the use of nuclear weapons. He actively participated in an organizations such as the American Veterans Committee, Americans for Democratic Action and SANE. In 1989 he founded Economists Against the Arms Race (ECAAR), now called Economists for Peace and Security (EPS)
