= Virginia War Museum =

Military museum in Newport News, Virginia

Coordinates: 37°1′10.9″N 76°27′6″W

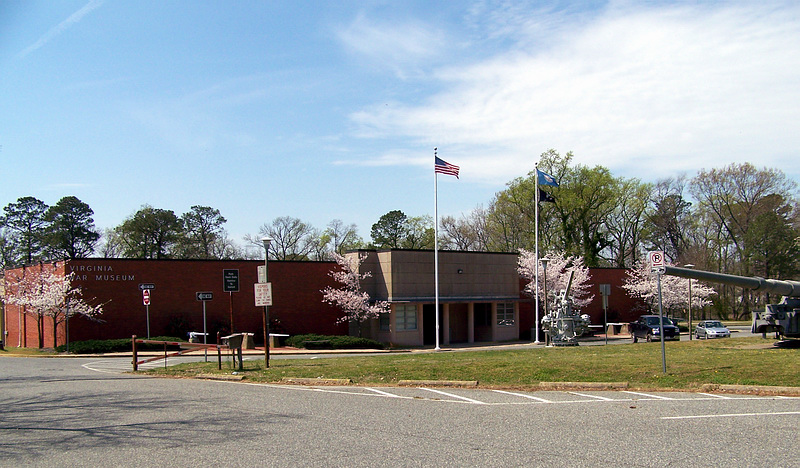
- Former name: American Legion Memorial Museum of Virginia (1923-1948); War Memorial Museum of Virginia (1948-1996)
- Established: 1923 (Collection); 1941 (Museum)
- Location: 9285 Warwick Boulevard; Newport News, Virginia; United States
- Type: Military History
- Director: Position Removed Circa 2012
- Curator: Position Removed May 1, 2019
- Website: Virginia War Museum

The Virginia War Museum is located in Huntington Park on Warwick Blvd., Newport News, Virginia. The museum contains exhibits on American military history from 1775 to the present.

== History ==
The Virginia War Museum was founded in 1923 by the Braxton-Perkins Post #25 of the American Legion as the American Legion Memorial Museum of Virginia. From 1923 to 1941, this "museum" existed as a "series of exhibits... housed and displayed in such public locations as were available," with no permanent structure or staff. It did not begin to take its present shape until 1941, when the American Legion began leasing the present museum's original core structure from the City of Newport News. In 1948, the museum renamed itself to the War Memorial Museum of Virginia. That same year, the commission to the Governor and the General Assembly of Virginia recommended that the museum be made a "memorial to those who served in World War II," so as to match the Carillon in Richmond that "was constructed as a State Memorial to those Virginians who served in World War I." At that time, there was also a large collection of exhibits from the National Advisory Committee for Aeronautics (NASA's predecessor NACA) at Langley Field was on display, with an estimated value of $40,000. This collection is long since gone, however, and is recorded only in some period photographs. It is likely that many are now present at the Virginia Air and Space Center, as this institution acts as the visitor center for both NASA Langley Research Center and Langley Air Force Base. By the 1950s, the City of Newport News had assumed administrative controls and the American Legion was reduced into an advisory role. In 1996, the museum was renamed once again to the Virginia War Museum.

The building has undergone three phases of construction. The original structure is visible as older brickwork, and was essentially a long, narrow building whose construction began in 1941 using $15,000 of State funds and $15,000 of city funds. By 1954, the shape of the museum had evolved from a line into a "T" with the completion of an addition (now the Early Wars, Poster, and African American gallery areas). The final addition was completed in 1987, in which the left side of the "T" was enclosed to form the Fowler and Weapons Galleries along with the current Education areas and restrooms.

== Collection ==
The museum's collection primarily centers on the First and Second World War, as the American Legion members who founded it were primarily World War I veterans, and many World War II troops passing through the Hampton Roads Port of Embarkation left things with the museum they did not wish to bring home. The large number of souvenirs given by American veterans has resulted in sizable displays on Imperial Japan and Nazi Germany, to include a section of the Dachau Concentration Camp removed during said camp's 1948/1949 refitting for use as refugee housing. Modern records keeping of the collection was begun in 1977, documenting the variety of objects still within the structure. An increasing number of pre-World War I objects were acquired starting in the 1980s, most notable of which are the uniforms of Moses Myers, on loan from the Chrysler Museum of Art.

The museum is arranged in a largely chronological manner, beginning with the American Revolutionary War, to the American Civil War, through the Philippine–American War, World War I, World War II, the Korean War, the Vietnam War, The 1980s, and War in Afghanistan. Following the main "timeline" is a Weapons Gallery, Poster Gallery, and an exhibit on African American military history.

The museum's collection also includes a section of the Berlin Wall, a handwritten order by General George Washington issued after the Battle of Brooklyn (On loan from the MacIntosh Family), and a great deal of General Officer Uniforms, including former possessions and clothing from Mark Clark, James Doolittle, and Colin Powell.

In the 1940s, the museum had a large collection of propellers from the First World War era and engines from both World Wars. These are now all gone save for a single propeller attributed to a Hansa-Brandenburg C.I. A search of the National Air and Space Museum Collections Database reveals that four of the engines were given to the Smithsonian in 1972, followed by a World War I USMC balloon basket in 1974.

In front of the museum is a large piece of artillery. In the past, this has been erroneously identified as a 240mm prototype of the M65 Atomic Cannon, but it is now known that this is not the case. The weapon is actually a conventional 240mm T1 Gun, one of two produced as part of a separate design program which was abandoned in favor of the T131 280mm Atomic Cannon program. Both the T1 and T131/M65 share T72 carriages.

One former artifact, Vought F4U Corsair 84620, is currently under restoration in Australia. The warbird was on display at the museum from 1948 until 1986, having lost its engine, tail, and port wing alongside suffering severe damage to its spar as a result of efforts to make it fit within the building. To correct this damage, 84620 has become one of the first Corsairs to have a new built main spar constructed as part of its restoration to airworthy status.

== Archaeology ==
The Department of Parks, Recreation and Tourism for the City of Newport News has their archaeology offices within the War Museum, along with the department's artifact storage. Excavations are carried out through the aid of grants and volunteers under the supervision of the City Archaeologist.

== Library and Archive ==
The museum has a small library for researchers located behind a door in the Poster Gallery. The area also serves as Archival Storage, and is accessed by appointment. Since 2012, the library has shifted from the Dewey Decimal System to use Library of Congress Classification for its books. Texts contained in the collection include military manuals, unit histories, uniform and equipment reference works, and general histories. Historical fiction works have largely been removed from circulation to free up needed shelf space for more relevant scholarly works.
