= 2S7 Pion =

Soviet heavy self-propelled gun

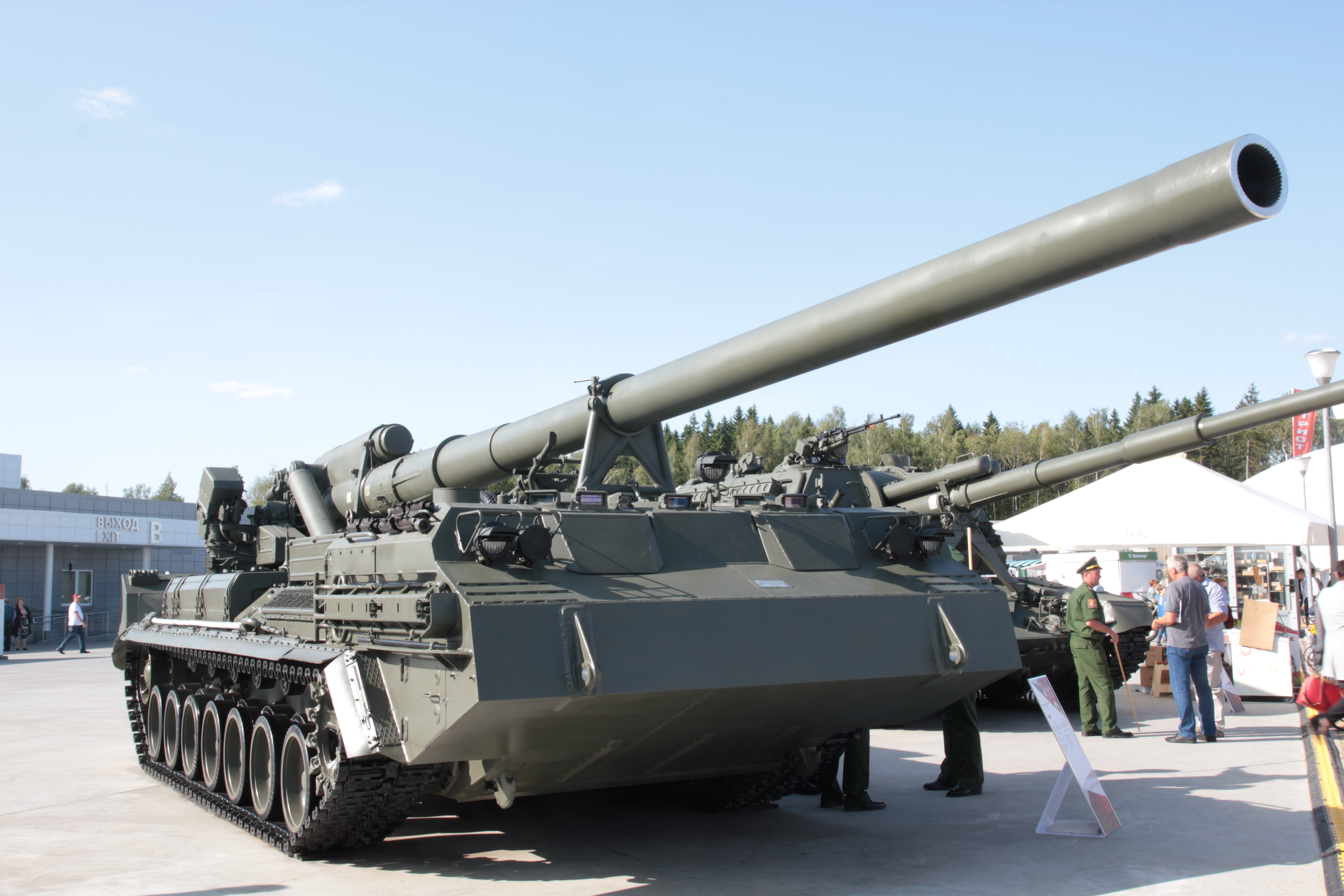
- Type: Self-propelled artillery
- Place of origin: Soviet Union

Service history
- In service: 1976–present
- Wars: Soviet–Afghan War; First Chechen War; Second Chechen War; Russo-Georgian War; Second Nagorno-Karabakh War; Russo-Ukrainian War

Production history
- Produced: 1975–1990

Specifications
- Mass: Whole vehicle: 46,500 kg (102,500 lb); Cannon: 14,600 kg (32,200 lb)
- Length: 10.5 m (34 ft 5 in)
- Width: 3.38 m (11 ft 1 in)
- Height: 3 m (9 ft 10 in)
- Crew: 14
- Shell weight: 103 kg (227 lb) or 110 kg (240 lb)
- Caliber: 203 mm
- Barrels: 1
- Carriage: 12 m (39 ft)
- Elevation: 0-60 deg
- Traverse: 30 deg
- Muzzle velocity: 960 m/s (3,100 ft/s)
- Effective firing range: 37.5 km (23.3 mi) (unassisted)
- Maximum firing range: 47.5 km (29.5 mi) (assisted)
- Armor: 10 mm (0.39 in)
- Main armament: 203 mm 2A44 gun L/56.2
- Engine: V-46-I V12 turbocharged diesel 630 kW (840 hp)
- Suspension: torsion bar
- Operational range: Road: 650 km (400 mi)
- Maximum speed: 50 km/h (31 mph)

The 2S7 Pion ("peony") or 2S7M Malka is a Soviet self-propelled 203 mm cannon. "2S7" is its GRAU designation. More than 250 units were built; some sources say 500, others up to 1,000. They were distributed around the former Soviet states during the dissolution of the Soviet Union in 1991.

== Description ==
The 2S7 Pion was identified for the first time in 1975 in the Soviet Army and was called M-1975 by NATO (the 2S4 Tyulpan also received the M-1975 designation), whereas its official designation is SO-203 (2S7). It used a new-design chassis, partly based on T-72 and T-80 design, carrying an externally mounted 2A44 203 mm gun on the hull rear. The vehicle is self-entrenching and has an overpressure CBRN defense system. It was reported that the 12 m (39 ft) gun weighs 14.6 t (14.4 long tons; 16.1 short tons) and has a service life of 450 rounds.

There are several manufacturers: the chassis was made at the Kirov Factory, St. Petersburg, Russia, while the gun and mount were made at the Titan-Barrikady plant in Volgograd, Russia.

The Malka modernization process in the late 2010s involved substituting several of the Ukrainian-produced components, such as the gearbox and engine, with new components manufactured in Russia at the Uraltransmash plant in Yekaterinburg.

The 2S7 uses a tracked chassis that was designed specifically for this artillery system. It uses a number of automotive components from the T-72 and T-80 main battle tanks. It is powered by a V-46-I turbocharged liquid-cooled V12 diesel engine, developing 560 kW (750 hp) (or 630 kW (840 hp)). It is also fitted with an auxiliary power unit, developing 18 kW (24 hp) and powering all systems when the main engine is shut down.

The 2S7 carries a crew of fourteen and eight rounds of ammunition; seven crewmembers and four rounds are carried by the Pion, with the remaining crew and rounds in an auxiliary vehicle.

It takes the crew about six minutes to set up and five minutes to dismantle. The vehicle carries four 203 mm projectiles for immediate use. The gun is capable of firing nuclear ammunition. The gun has a range of 37.5 km (23.3 mi), but this can be extended to 47.5 km (29.5 mi) by using a rocket-assisted projectile. One interesting feature of the Pion is the firing alarm. Because the blast of the weapon firing is so powerful, it can physically incapacitate an unprepared soldier or crew member near it from the concussive force, the Pion is therefore equipped with an audible firing alarm that emits a series of short warning tones for approximately five seconds prior to the round being fired.

== Operational and combat history ==
- Russian forces used it in the First and Second Chechen Wars (First war: 1994–1996, Second war: 1999–2009)
- The Georgian Army used 2S7s in the Russo-Georgian War in 2008 (7–16 August 2008), five were visually confirmed as lost during the war: four destroyed and one captured by the Russian forces.
- 2S7s were brought back into service by the Ukrainian army during the war in Donbas in late 2014, and were used in combat just outside the 'buffer' zone stipulated by the Minsk Protocol, as they had long enough range to still provide artillery support.
- The Russian armed forces are reinforcing their artillery forces, reactivating 2S7M Malka 203 mm self-propelled howitzers and 2S4 Tyulpan 240 mm self-propelled mortars. The upgraded 2S7M SPH is linked to the modernised 1V12M command vehicle, which uses a GLONASS navigation unit.
- Video released by the Azerbaijan Ministry of Defence showed their 2S7s in use during the 2020 Nagorno-Karabakh war.
- Russian 2S7s were pictured moving towards the border with Ukraine during the prelude to the Russian invasion of Ukraine.
- It was used by Ukrainian Forces during the 2022 Russian invasion of Ukraine as early as 25 February 2022. In June 2023, Ukraine started using American supplied M106 high-explosive 203 mm (8 inch) shells used by the M110 howitzer.
- It was used by Russian Forces during the Russo-Ukrainian War, as reported in Newsweek on 27 May 2022. Satellite imagery shows that Russian forces deployed 2S7 south of Donetsk city in September 2022.

Russian army uses 2S7M Malka howitzers during Invasion of Ukraine. February 2024

== Variants ==
The original version is known as the 2S7 Pion.

An updated version called the 2S7M Malka entered service in either 1983 or 1986. The 2S7M Malka uses an improved fire control system that increased the rate of fire from 1.5 to 2.5 rounds per minute, and increased the ammunition load to eight projectiles.

The BTM-4 Tundra trench digger shares the 2S7 Pion chassis.

== Operators ==
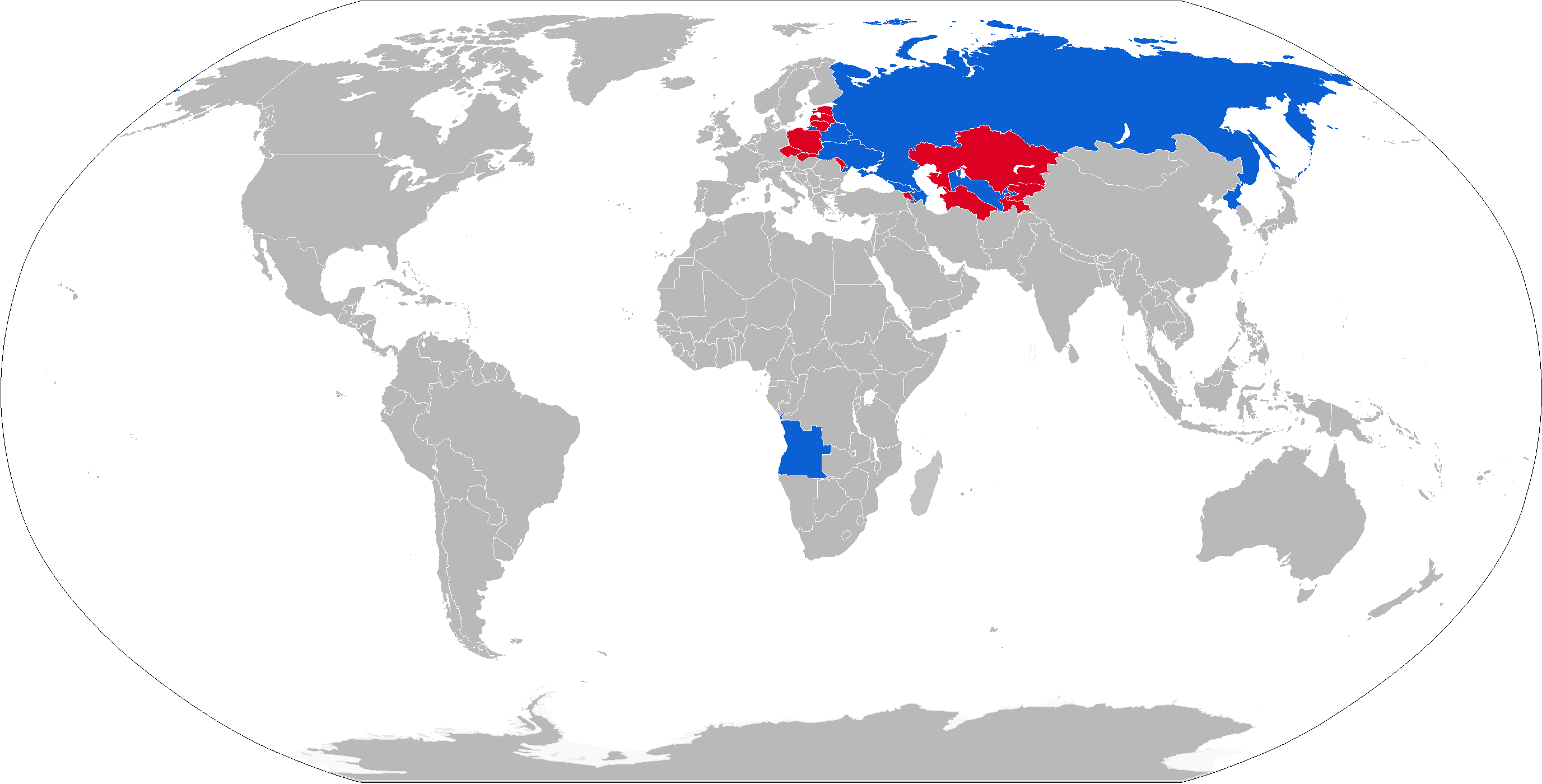
Operators: Current Former

Although no figures have been released, it is estimated that well over 1,000 have been built. The Soviet Army had 347 in active service as of 1990.

=== Current operators ===
- Angola – 12, acquired in 2000 from the Czech Republic
- Azerbaijan – at least 12, acquired from Russia in 2008–2009
- Georgia − 1 as of 2023
- North Korea - 180
- Russia – 60 2S7M in active service, 260 2S7 in reserve as of 2022. Modernisation with new running gear and electronics completed as of December 2021
- Ukraine – 99, brought from reserve and restored to active service due to the war in Donbas and ongoing Russian invasion of Ukraine

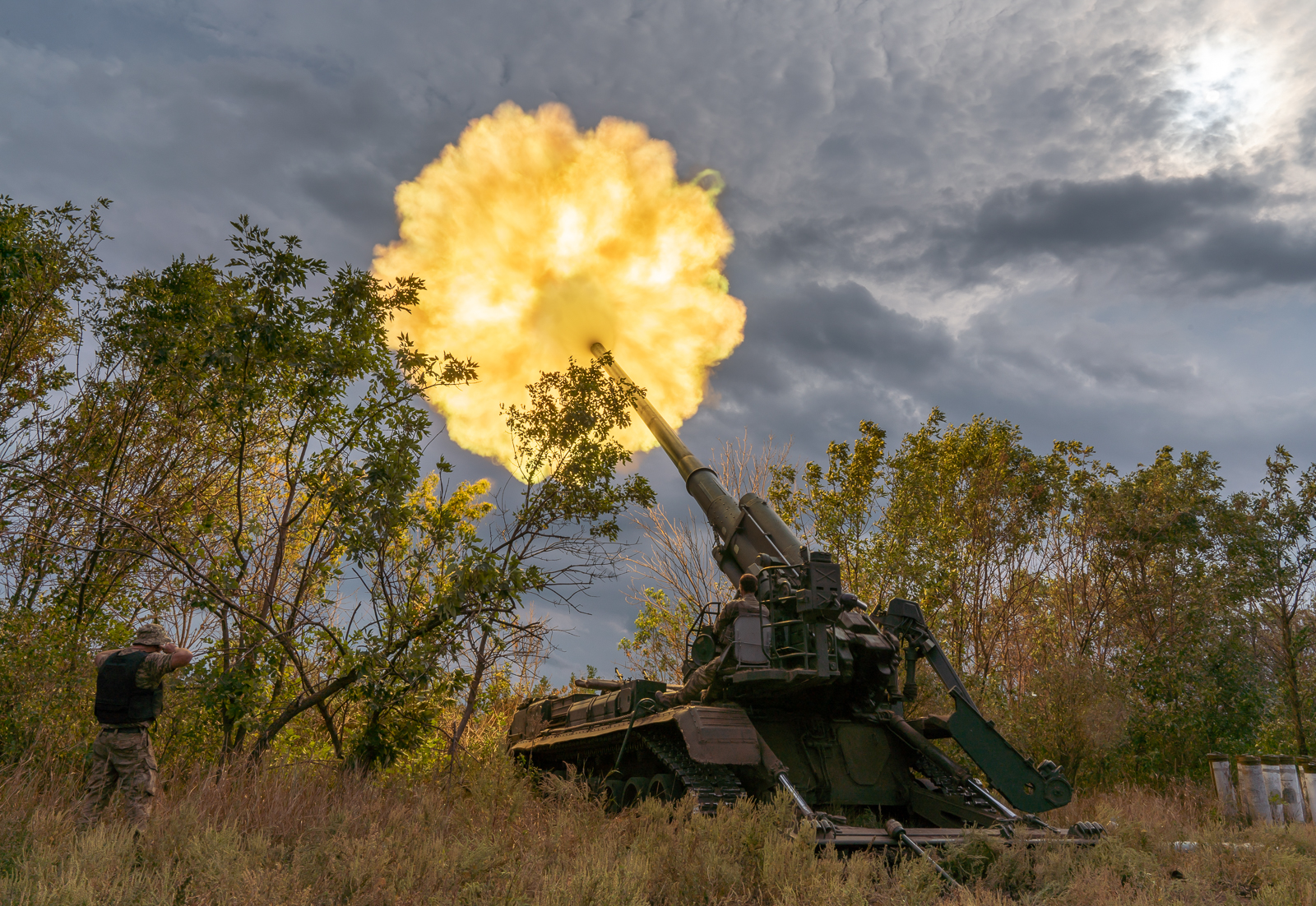
2S7 Pion of the Armed Forces of Ukraine firing

=== Former operators ===
- Belarus − 36 in 2010
- Czechoslovakia – 12 operated by 17th Large Caliber Artillery Division in Žamberk, 1984–1994. One kept in Military museum Lešany
- Poland − 8 in 1989, all retired in 2006, one kept at Lubuskie Military Museum, Drzonów
- Slovakia – Three were inherited from the Czechoslovak Army, from these, two are kept at the Piešťany military history museum, and the other one is in the inventory of Military technical and testing institute Záhorie.
- Soviet Union – passed on to successor states

== See also ==
- 2B1 Oka – (Soviet Union)
- 2A3 Kondensator 2P – (Soviet Union)
- 180 mm gun S-23 – (Soviet Union)
- 240 mm mortar M240 – (Soviet Union)
- M110 howitzer – (United States)
- M-1978 Koksan – (North Korea)
