= 2S4 Tyulpan =

Soviet heavy self-propelled mortar

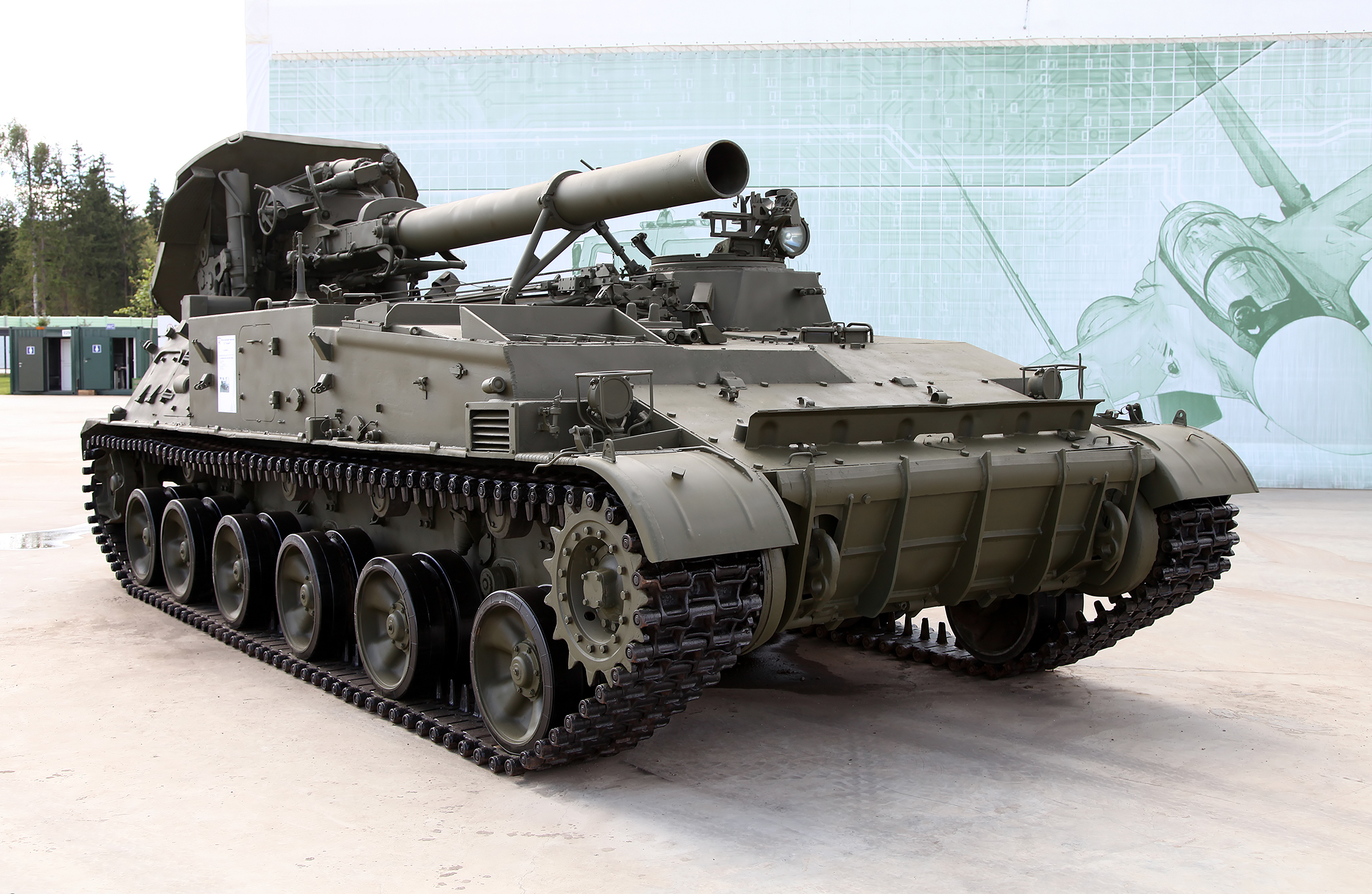
- A 2S4 Tyulpan on display at Patriot Park
- Type: Self-propelled heavy mortar
- Place of origin: Soviet Union

Service history
- In service: 1975−present
- Used by: See Operators
- Wars: Lebanese Civil War; Soviet-Afghan War; First Chechen War; Second Chechen War; Russo-Ukrainian War

Production history
- Designer: Yuri V. Tomashov; Yuri N. Kalachnikov
- Manufacturer: Uraltransmash
- No. built: 450

Specifications
- Mass: 27,500 kg (60,600 lb)
- Length: 7.94 m (26.0 ft)
- Width: 3.25 m (10 3/4 ft)
- Height: 3.225 m (10 1/2 ft)
- Crew: 4+5 (Note: The 2S4 can carry four crew members while the remaining five are carried in the supporting vehicle (either a 6×6 truck or a MT-LB artillery tractor).)
- Elevation: 50°−80°
- Traverse: 10°
- Rate of fire: 1 rpm (Note: At an elevation of 60° the rate of fire is one round every 62 seconds while at an elevation of 80° the maximum rate of fire goes down to one round every 77 seconds.)
- Maximum firing range: 18,000 m (20,000 yd)
- Armor: Steel
- Main armament: 240 mm 2B8 mortar (40 rounds)
- Secondary armament: PKT machine gun (1,500 rounds)
- Engine: V-59, V12 Diesel engine 520 hp (390 kW)
- Power/weight: 18.9 hp/t (14.1 kW/t)
- Suspension: Torsion bar
- Ground clearance: 0.4 m (1 ft 4 in)
- Fuel capacity: 850 L (190 imp gal; 220 US gal)
- Operational range: 500 km (310 mi)
- Maximum speed: 60 km/h (37 mph)

The 2S4 Tyulpan (often spelled Tulpan, Russian: 2С4 «Тюльпан», lit. 'tulip') is a Soviet 240 mm (9.4 in) self-propelled heavy mortar. "2S4" is its GRAU designation. The Tyulpan is the largest mortar system in use today. It saw use in Afghanistan, Lebanon, Chechnya, and Ukraine.

== Background ==
During and after World War II, the Soviets designed and made use of towed heavy mortars, such as the 160 mm mortar M1943, which was one of the heaviest mortars in general use during the war (second only to the German Karl-Gerät self-propelled heavy mortars), and the post-war 240 mm mortar M240. The first self-propelled mortar was the 2B1 Oka, based on the Iosif Stalin tank chassis capable of firing a 420 mm (17 in) shell at a distance of 45 km (28 mi). A few examples were built and paraded in the early 1960s, but ultimately the Oka wasn't adopted due to Nikita Khrushchev's preference for missiles over heavy guns.

The towed M240, used by artillery regiments of rifle divisions during the 1950s until they were reassigned in the late 1950s to heavy mortar battalions, proved to be rather impractical in combat: the 3OF-864 shell weighed 130 kg (290 lb), which made difficult for crews to load the weapon without the aid of a small crane.

According to the US Marine Corps Intelligence, the Soviets desire for a self-propelled mortar was renewed with the development of nuclear projectiles. Although the Soviet Army was well supplied with nuclear Luna-M rockets and R-11 Zemlya tactical ballistic missiles, nuclear shells had the advantage of being less bulky and having greater accuracy. Additionally, the 240 mm mortar shells of the M240 also have a greater destructive effect than artillery shells of comparable caliber, (Note: Mortar shells have relatively thin walls in comparison to artillery shells, allowing them to carry larger explosive payloads.) making them well suited for striking protected targets, such as entrenched command centers, enemy forces on reverse slopes of hills, or enemy defensive fortifications.

Development of a practical self-propelled mortar started in the early 1960s by Yuri V. Tomashov's Design Bureau at Uraltransmash plant under the designation Obiekt 305. It combined the GM chassis with a modified version of the 240 mm M240 mortar, the 2B8 developed by Yuri N. Kalachnikov at the Perm Machine Building Plant. It was introduced into the Soviet Army in the early 1970s as the 2S4 Tyulpan ('Tulip'), reaching full operational status in 1975, being designated by Western intelligence as the M-1975 240 mm self-propelled mortar.

== Description ==
The 2S4 Tyulpan uses a modified 2K11 Krug chassis and carries an externally mounted 240 mm 2B8 smoothbore mortar complete with its baseplate on the rear of the hull and a dozer blade at the front to prepare firing positions. The hull provides the crew protection against shrapnel and small arms fire. An NBC protection system and night vision equipment are also included. The 2S4 can carry a crew of four while the other five members are carried in the supporting vehicle, usually a 6×6 truck or a MT-LB artillery tractor.

The driver and the commander are seated on the front left side of the vehicle, while the rest of the crew and the ammunition are positioned in the rear. The driver is provided with a single-piece hatch cover that opens to the rear with periscopes for forward observation. The central periscope can be replaced with by a passive night vision device. Behind the driver, the commander has an elevated cupola that can be rotated a full 360° and features an externally mounted PKT machine gun and an infra-red searchlight, with additional hatches mounted on the roof.

The 2S4 has a capacity of 40 standard high-explosive mortar rounds and 1,500 rounds for the PKT machine gun, or 20 Rocket-assisted projectiles (RAP). These are placed in two automated drum-type magazines. The rounds are fed to the top of the carrier, where they are placed on a track. The mortar then tilts to the horizontal position. The breech opens, and a telescoping rammer pushes the round into the breech, then the bagged propellant charge. The breech closes, and the mortar tilts into the firing position. In combat, the mortar is elevated between 50° and 80°, and it can fire one round per minute. The 2S4 is fired either with a mechanical or electrical trigger.

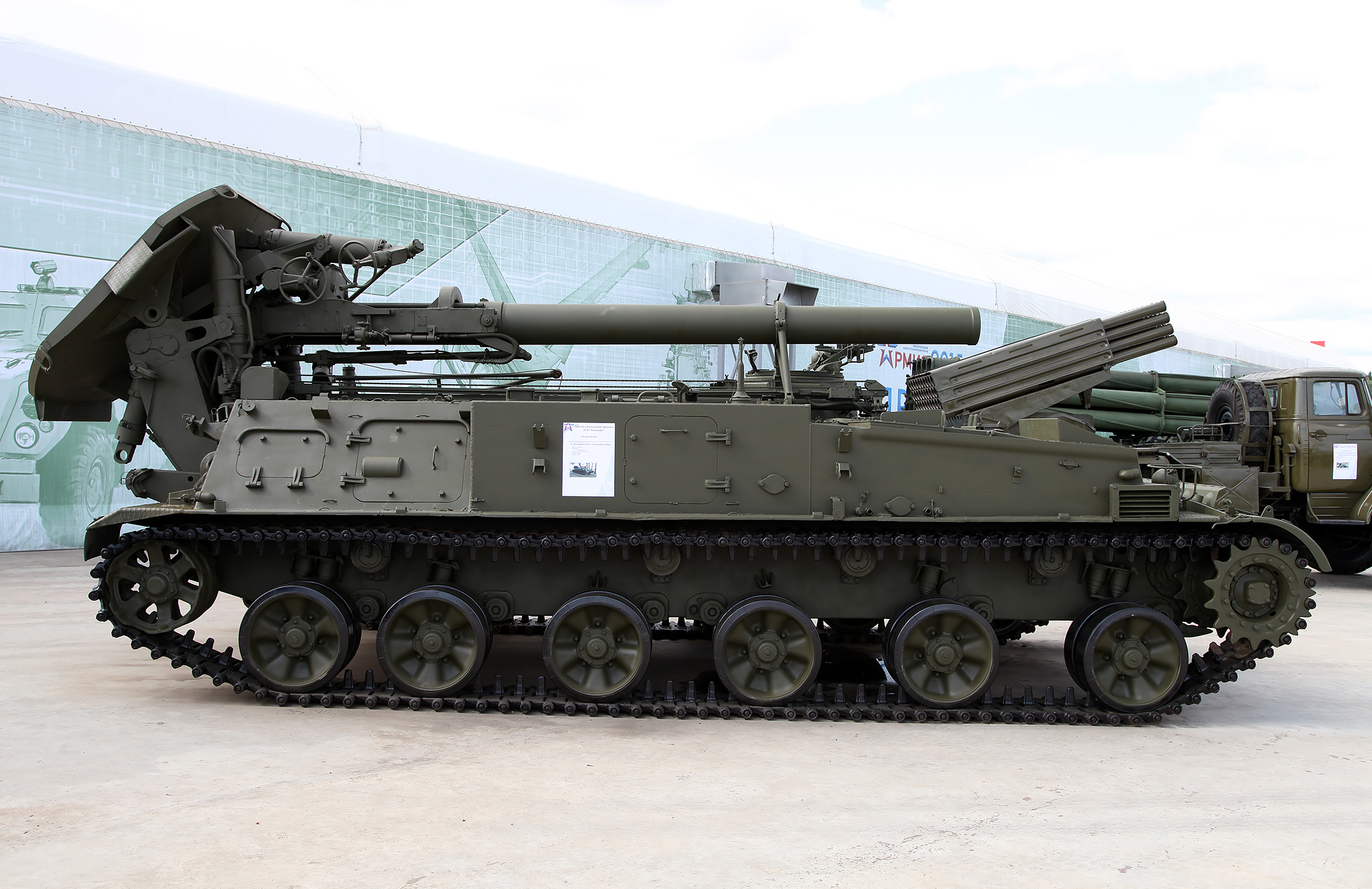
The 2S4 in profile

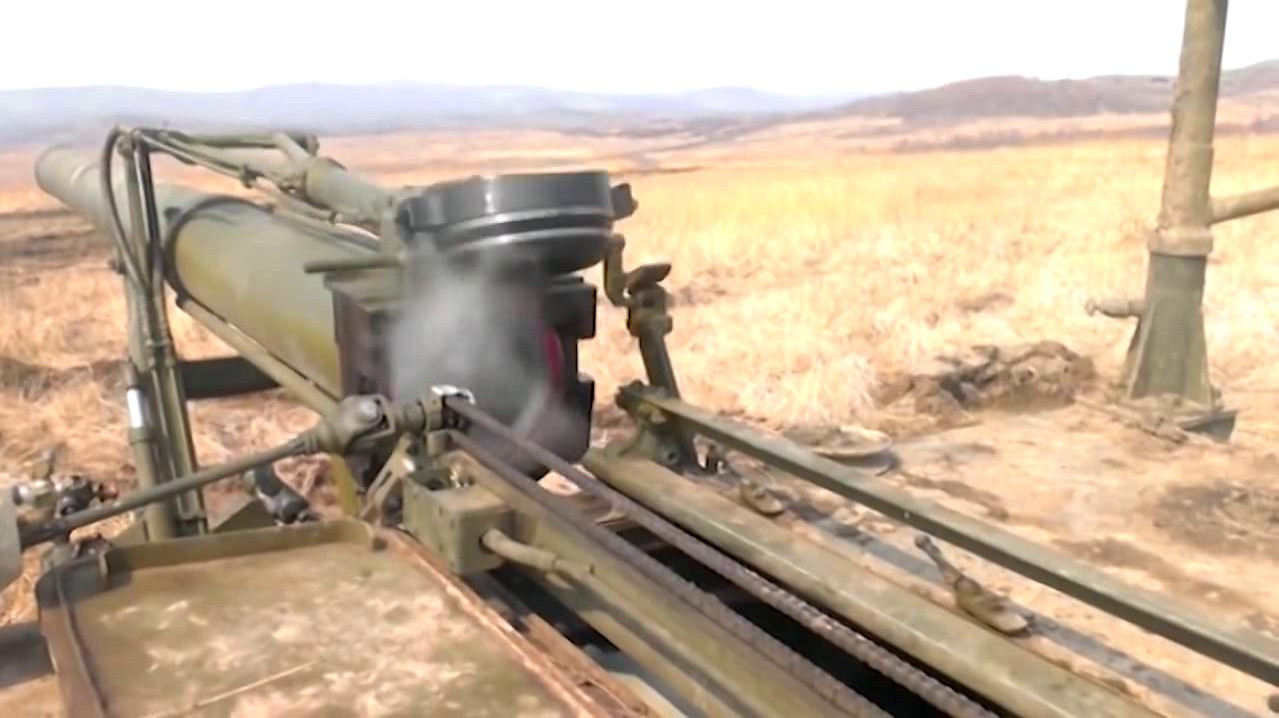
The 2S4 is breech loaded with the tube in horizontal

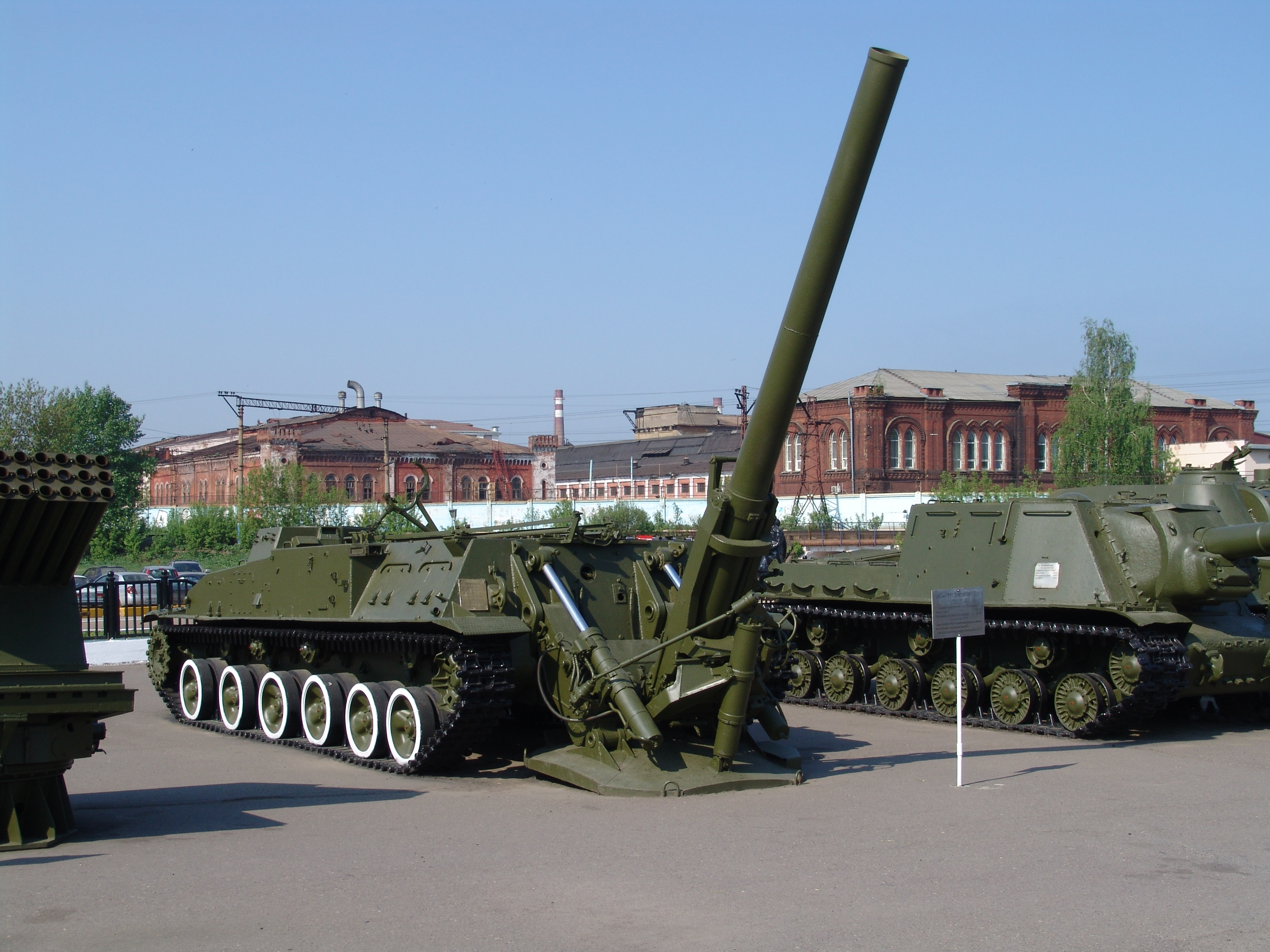
The Tyulpan in deployed position.

The primary ammunition for the weapon is the high-explosive (HE) 53-F-864 mortar round, which has a total weight of 130 kg (290 lb). The GMWZ-7 fuze can be set either to have a delayed action or to detonate on contact. The weapon uses a five-part propelling charge system, which varies the muzzle velocity from 158 to 362 m/s (520 to 1,190 ft/s) and grants a range of up to 9,650 m (10,550 yd). Another basic type of ammunition used is a HE fragmentation RAP round weighing 228 kg (503 lb) with a maximum range of 18,000 m (20,000 yd). Minimum range is 800 m (870 yd).

Other types of 240 mm mortar rounds developed include chemical, concrete-piercing, and tactical nuclear. Russian sources state that the chemical and nuclear rounds have been phased out from service. According to Lyamin and Jenzen-Jones, the Soviets also developed a cluster munition (designated as the 3O8 Nerpa), and the Sayda incendiary round. The Nerpa round weighs 230 kg (510 lb), while the warhead itself weighs 112 kg (247 lb), have a range of 7.1–19.3 km (4.4–12.0 mi). (Note: Maximum range of the 3O8 round is reduced to 15 km (9.3 mi) with brake rings attached.) Each round releases 14 submunitions.

The 2S4 Tyulpan can also fire the 3F5 Smel'chak ('Daredevil') laser-guided mortar round, which was developed in the 1980s and successfully tested in Afghanistan, where it was fired from the towed M240 mortar. Besides the projectile itself and the mortar, the system also includes the 1D15 laser designator and rangefinder, the 1A35K/1A35J synchronization system and communication equipment. Usually a forward observer locates the target, the command post calculates the target laying information brought by the observer, the Smel'chak round is then loaded, aimed at the target and fired. Once the round is within 400–800 m (440–870 yd) of the target the self-guidance system is activated: a laser designator "paints" the target for a short period of time (making it difficult to jam) and the projectile homes onto the target accordingly. If the round is veering off course, a rocket motor engages to correct its flight. The 1D15 designator have a ×10 monocular sight, can designate targets from 200–10,000 m (220–10,940 yd) with a circular error probability of 10 m (11 yd). The Smel'chak has a minimum range of 3.6 km (2.2 mi) and a maximum range of 9.2 km (5.7 mi) with the laser designator ranging from 0.2–5 km (0.12–3.11 mi). The 3F5 weighs 134.2 kg (296 lb), of which 32 kg (71 lb) is the warhead.

The tracked suspension is a torsion bar type consisting of a pair of drive sprockets located at the front of the vehicle, idler wheels at the rear, six pairs of rubber tyred road wheels, and four pairs of return rollers.

== Variants ==
- A modernized variant was introduced into service with Russian military in 2017. It has a new barrel, hydraulic recoil mechanism, communication systems, and positioning and fire-control system.

== Operational history ==
Video of Tyulpan in action

According to Foss, around 450 vehicles were built in total, while the Russian Federation hasn't disclosed any production figures. Foss also points out that the Russians maintain a small number of 2S4s in front line service due the weapon short range and low rate of fire.

The Tyulpan was exported to Czechoslovakia, Iraq, and Lebanon. It is no longer in service with these countries.

The 2S4 saw action during the conflicts in Afghanistan (Note: Erroneously referred to by Isby as the "240mm SP M-1977".) and Chechnya.

According to Isby, the Soviets made use of heavy artillery including the 2S4 in Afghanistan in early months of 1980. By 1984, they were brought back to action against the Afghan mujahideen. Use of 240 mm mortars was reported during the Lebanese Civil War, with the Lebanese Forces receiving at least 3 2S4s from Iraq.

During the First Chechen War, the Russian Army deployed four 2S4s in the 1994 campaign and ten in the 1996 campaign. During the latter, they were used to bombard rebel positions in Grozny, effectively destroying the city. In the second war against the Chechen rebels, the Russian Army expended about 1,410 HE rounds, 40 anti-personnel rounds and 60 laser-guided rounds between January and February 2000.

There were also reports that the Tyulpan may have been used by the Syrian Army during the 2012 bombardment of Homs. However, other reports suggest that the towed M240s were used instead.

OSCE observers, monitoring movements of equipment in the war in Donbas with a UAV, spotted a 2S4 on territory under control of the Donetsk People's Republic on 4 July 2015.

In May 2022, 2S4 Tyulpan were reported being used in the Russian invasion of Ukraine, with 58 units destroyed by Ukrainian forces as of May 2026, as documented by the OSINT research website Oryx. According to Rob Lee of the Foreign Policy Research Institute, Russian 2S4 crews are "likely a priority for Ukrainian counter-battery fire".

== Operators ==
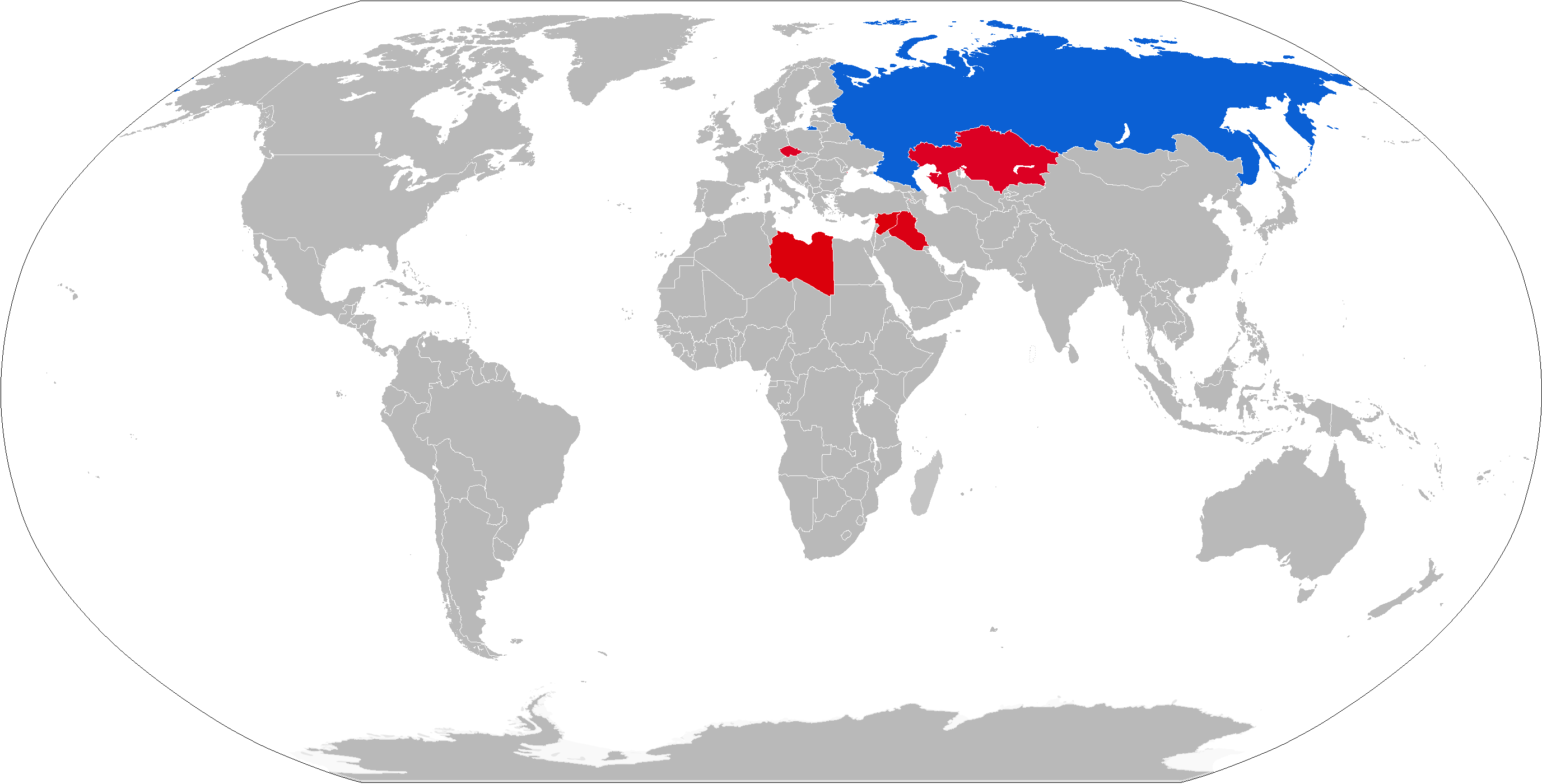
Map with 2S4 operators in blue and former operators in red

=== Current ===
- Kazakhstan – Estimated to have 7 in service as of 2026
- Russia – According to Foss, Russia had a total of 400 vehicles (including those in storage) in 2011. In February 2026, this number declined to 50 vehicles in active service and 100 in storage, according to the International Institute for Strategic Studies

=== Former ===
- Czechoslovakia – 8 received between 1988 and 1989, passed on to successor states
- Czech Republic − Remained in service as late as 1994
- Iraq – 10 received in 1983, remained in service as late as 1994
- Lebanese Forces − 3 received from Iraq in 1988
- Slovakia − Remained in service as late as 1994
- Soviet Union – 55 were in active service in 1991

== See also ==
- 2B1 Oka
- 2S7 Pion
- 2A3 Kondensator 2P
- 180 mm gun S-23
- 240 mm mortar M240

== Bibliography ==
- Foss, Christopher F, ed. (1994). Jane's Armour and Artillery: 1994–95 (15th ed.). Jane's Information Group. p. 654. ISBN 978-0-7106-1154-3.
- Foss, Christopher F, ed. (2011). Jane's Armour and Artillery 2011–2012 (32nd ed.). Jane's Information Group. ISBN 978-0-7106-2960-9.
- International Institute for Strategic Studies (23 February 2026). "Chapter Four: Russia and Eurasia". The Military Balance. 126 (1). Taylor & Francis: 160–215. doi:10.1080/04597222.2026.2608517.
- Isby, David (2013) [1983]. Russia's War in Afghanistan. Bloomsbury Publishing. ISBN 978-1-4728-0179-1.
- Soviet/Russian Armor and Artillery Design Practices: 1945-1995. Quantico, VA: Marine Corps Intelligence Activity. 1995.
