= Tulip (disambiguation) =

A tulip is a bulbous plant in the genus Tulipa.

Tulip or Tulips may also refer to:

== Arts and entertainment ==
=== Music ===
- Tulip (album), a 1990 album by Steel Pole Bath Tub
- "Tulips" (song), by Bloc Party from their 2004 EP Little Thoughts
- "Tulip", a song by Kevin Coyne from his 1975 album Matching Head and Feet

=== Other ===
- Tulips (poem), by Sylvia Plath, about her experiences in a mental hospital
- Tulips (film), a 1981 comedy-drama film
- Tulips (Koons), artwork by Jeff Koons
- Tulip Jones, a character in the Alex Rider spy novel series
- Tulip O'Hare, a fictional character from the comic book series Preacher

== In the military ==
- HMS Tulip, two Royal Navy ships
- USS Tulip, two US Navy vessels

== Businesses ==
- Tulip Computers, a Dutch PC clone manufacturer from 1979 to 2009
- Tulip Telecom, an Indian telecommunications services provider
- TULIP Cooperative Credit Union, Olympia, Washington
- La Tulipe, a restaurant in New York City from 1979 to 1991

== Media ==
- Tulip Television, a television station in Toyama Prefecture, Japan
- Tulip Radio, the local community radio station covering Spalding, Lincolnshire, England

== People ==
- Tulip (name), a list of people with either the given name or surname

== Places ==
In the United States

- Tulip, Indiana, an unincorporated community
  - Tulip Viaduct, Indiana
- Tulip, Missouri, an unincorporated community
- Tulip, Ohio, an unincorporated community

== TULIP ==
- The Five Points of Calvinism, summarized under the acrostic TULIP
- Transurethral laser-induced prostatectomy
- Trade Unions Linking Israel and Palestine, a group advocating engagement between trade unions (and against boycotts) as a means to Mideast peace

== Other ==
- Liriodendron tulipifera, the American tulip tree
- Tulip (software), a Computer Graph Visualization program
- Tulip Methodist Church, Marsalis, Louisiana, on the National Register of Historic Places
- Tulip Rally, the oldest Dutch rally competition
- Tulip (tower), proposed but rejected tower in London
- Tulip Bowl, the final match in the top division, American Football Bond Nederland, in the Netherlands
- Atorvastatin, a drug better known by the trade name Lipitor and under the brand name Tulip

== See also ==
- Tulip period, a period in Ottoman history (1718–1730)
- The Kyrgyz Tulip Revolution of 2005
- 2S4 Tyulpan ("Tulip"), a Soviet self-propelled mortar
- Tulip Mania, a speculative bubble in tulips peaking in February 1637
