= Fanfan la Tulipe (disambiguation) =

Fanfan la Tulipe may refer to:

- Fanfan la Tulipe (poem), an 1819 poem by Paul Émile Debraux
- Fanfan la Tulipe (operetta), an 1882 operetta by Louis Varney

== Film ==
- Fanfan la Tulipe (1907 film), a 1907 silent short film
- Fanfan la Tulipe (1925 film), a French swashbuckler film
- Fanfan la Tulipe (1952 film), a 1952 version featuring Gina Lollobrigida
- Fanfan la Tulipe (2003 film), a remake of the earlier films starring Penélope Cruz

== See also ==
- Fanfan (disambiguation)
- Tulip (disambiguation)
