= 2K1 Mars =

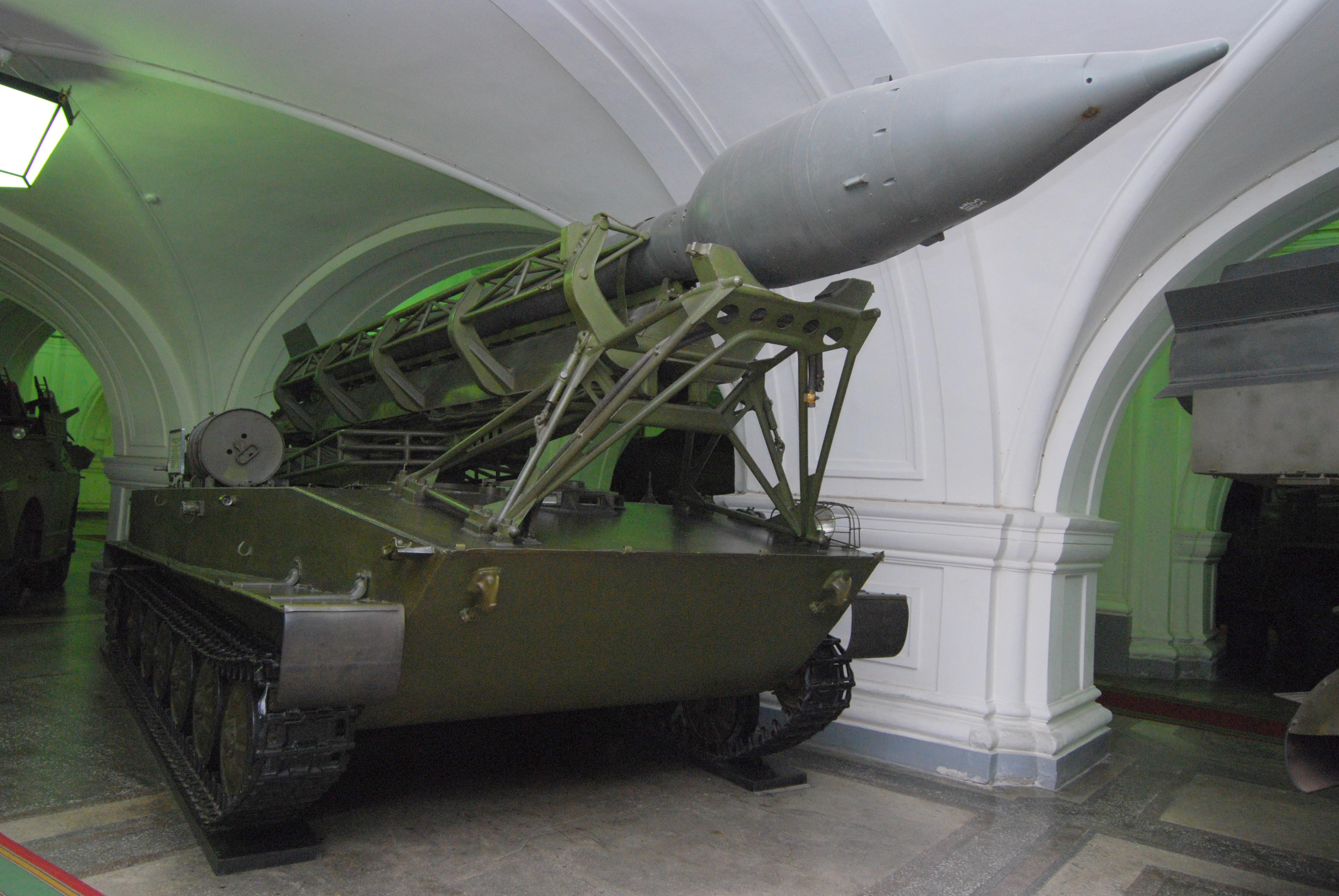
- Type: Artillery rocket system
- Place of origin: Soviet Union

Specifications
- Maximum firing range: 18 km (11 mi)
- Engine: 3R1
- Guidance system: ballistic

The Mars (Russian: Марс, lit. 'Mars'; NATO reporting name FROG-2, GRAU index 2K1, 2К1) was a Soviet solid-fuel tactical missile system with a range of 7 to 18 km.

The chief designer was N. P. Mazur.

- Weight of launcher: 15 tons, based on PT-76 tank
- rocket engine: 3R1
- missile diameter: 1.75 m
- guidance: by launcher
- maximum speed of launcher: 35 km/h

== History ==
=== Background ===
At 3 meters long, between 0.7 and 1.5 meters in diameter, and weighing 4-5 tons, the earliest nuclear weapons were so large and heavy that they could only be carried by strategic bombers such as the United States Boeing B-29 Superfortress, Convair B-36 Peacemaker and the Soviet Tupolev Tu-4. However, use of these aircraft in the 1950s for nuclear strikes on forward positions of enemy troops in a theatre of military operations was impractical. By the mid-1950s, nuclear weapons development led to increases in their power and technical characteristics while reducing their diameters and masses, and therefore creating the possibility of using them in a variety of delivery vehicles. In particular, tactical strike aircraft became suitable carriers, but their application depended on factors including time of day, weather conditions, and the intensity of enemy air defenses. Additionally, the response time of tactical strike aircraft was very large. Under these circumstances, it became desirable to provide army units with their own means of delivering nuclear warheads. In the 1950s, these means included traditional artillery pieces, recoil-less rifles, and unguided tactical missiles. Work was carried out on all three of these options in the United States, and, after some delay, in the Soviet Union too.

The available nuclear weapons technology did not allow the creation of sufficiently compact ammunition, so artillery solutions, including the American 280-mm T131 gun and Soviet 406-mm SM-54 (2A3) rifled gun and 420-mm SM-58 (2B1) smoothbore mortar, became too heavy and clumsy — the 2A3 weighed 55 tonnes, the T131 weighed 75.5 tonnes. These pieces could not be towed over bridges, could not navigate urban and rural streets, and required a lot of time to prepare for firing.

In both the US and the USSR, the alternative to these too-heavy artillery shells was unguided tactical rockets as carriers of nuclear weapons. The main advantages were:

- Inertial guidance systems of the 1950s and 60s at ranges of around 30 km could achieve accuracies of only around 500–1000 m (CEP), comparable with the accuracy of unguided rockets.
- The use of radio guidance was undesirable because it made the rocket vulnerable to interference. Additionally, it required the establishment of a guidance post on the ground or in the air.
- Active homing systems for marine and air targets had not yet been developed in the early 1950s, let alone systems designed for ground targets.
