= SM-58 =

SM-58 could refer to:

- 2B1 Oka self-propelled gun
- Shure SM58 microphone
