= Phanphan =

Phanphan or PhanPhan may refer to:

- Phanphan, a character in HappinessCharge PreCure!
- PhanPhan, a character in Kirby: Right Back at Ya!

== See also ==
- Fanfan (disambiguation)
