= Tulips (Koons) =

Series of sculptures by Jeff Koons

- Tulips at The Broad, 2022
- Artist: Jeff Koons

Tulips is a series of sculptures by American artist Jeff Koons, made between 1995 and 2004. There are five unique versions. One sculpture is part of the collection of The Broad in Los Angeles, California. Another is at the Guggenheim Museum Bilbao. In November 2012 Steve Wynn acquired an edition at auction for US$33,682,500. It was on display at Wynn Las Vegas from 2013 to 2016, then on display at a Wynn Palace in Macau, China, before returning to Las Vegas in 2019 where it remains on display at the Wynn Plaza. Additional copies are on display at Fondazione Prada and held by the Viktor Pinchuk Foundation.
