= Fanfan (disambiguation) =

Fanfan is a 1993 French romantic comedy film directed by Alexandre Jardin based on his 1990 novel.

Fanfan or Fan Fan may also refer to:

== People ==
- Fan Fan, a rally driver, see 2013 Asia-Pacific Rally Championship
- FanFan (born 1976), Taiwanese singer
- Mose Se Sengo, a.k.a. "Fan Fan", Congolese musician
- José-Karl Pierre-Fanfan (born 1975), French association footballer
- Ducan Fanfan, see United States v. Booker
- Fan-Fan, pen name of Frances Irene Burge Griswold (1826–1900)

== Other uses ==
- Fanfan, 1990 French novel by Alexandre Jardin
- Fan Fan, 1918 American comedy-drama film with Virginia Lee Corbin

== See also ==
- Fan (disambiguation)
- Fanfan la Tulipe (disambiguation)
