= Tulip (name) =

Tulip is a given name and a surname which may refer to:

== Given name ==
- Tulip Joshi (born 1980), Bollywood actress
- Tulip Mazumdar (born c. 1981), British journalist and broadcaster currently with the BBC
- Tulip Siddiq (born 1982), British politician

== Surname ==
- Bill Tulip (born 1933), English former footballer
- Joe Tulip (died 1979), English footballer in the Scottish League, debuting in 1933
- Marie Tulip (1935–2015), Australian feminist writer, academic and theologian

== Fictional characters ==
- Tulip Olsen, the main character in Book One of the animated anthology series Infinity Train
