= 240 mm mortar M240 =

Soviet-made towed heavy mortar

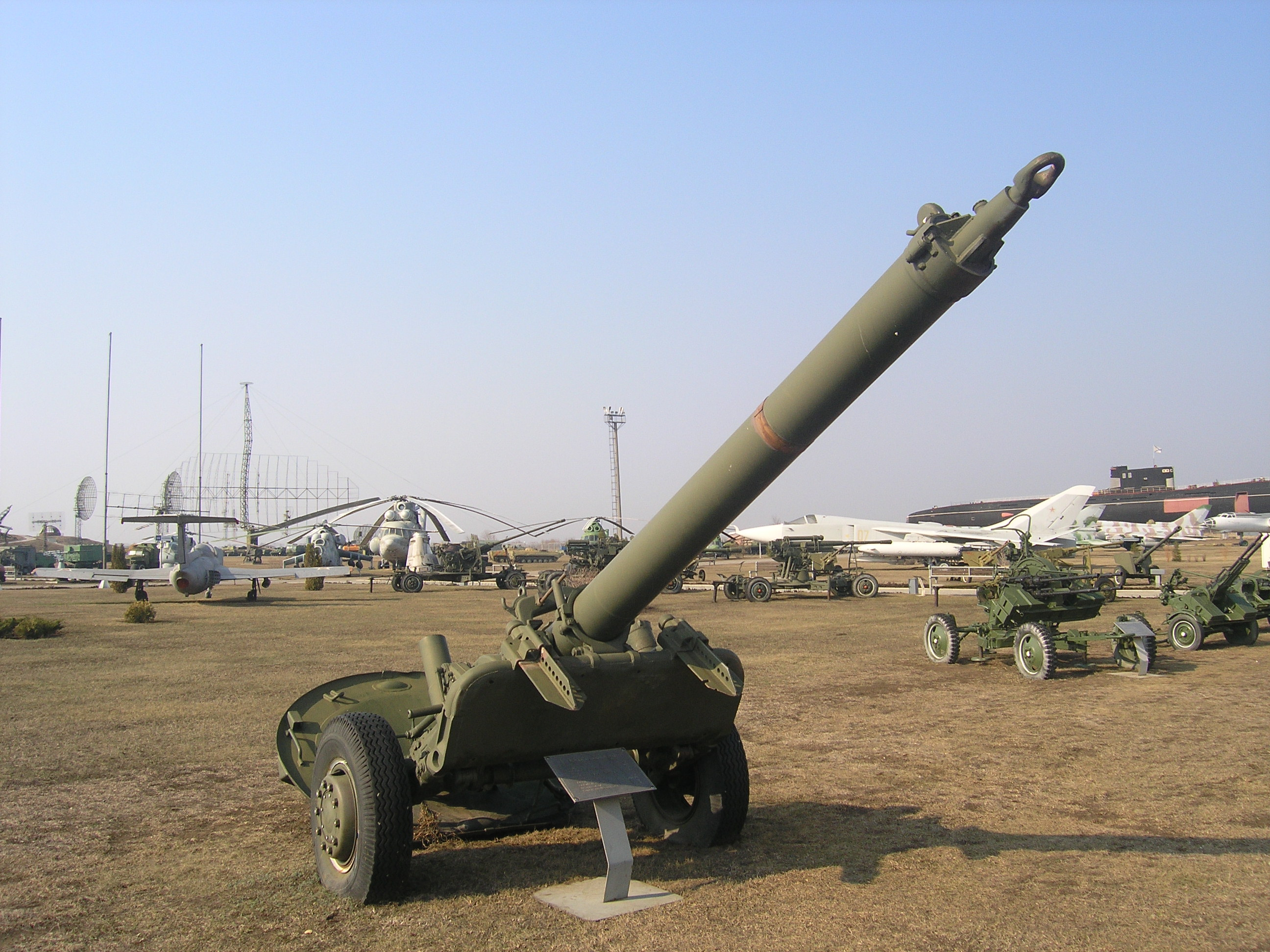
- Type: Towed mortar
- Place of origin: Soviet Union

Service history
- In service: 1953–present
- Wars: Yom Kippur War; Lebanese Civil War; Soviet–Afghan War; Iran–Iraq War; First Chechen War; Second Chechen War; Syrian Civil War; Russian invasion of Ukraine

Specifications
- Mass: Static: 3,610 kg (7,960 lb); Combat: 4,150 kg (9,150 lb)
- Barrel length: 534 cm (17 ft 6 ins)
- Crew: 11
- Shell: (HE) 130 kg (286 lbs)
- Caliber: 240 mm (9.4 in)
- Elevation: +45° to +65°
- Traverse: 17°
- Rate of fire: 1 round/minute
- Maximum firing range: 9.7 km (6.0 mi); 20 km (12 mi) (with rocket-assisted)

The Soviet 240 mm mortar M240 is a 240 millimeter (9.4 in) breech loading smoothbore heavy mortar that fires a 130 kilogram (290 lb) projectile. It entered service in 1953.

== Description ==
The mortar consists of a smooth-bored barrel with a breech and a breech-block frame, a frame with shock absorbers, mount with training and equilibrating mechanisms, a two-wheel traveling carriage with the suspension, a boom for changing from the firing to the traveling configuration, a baseplate and a towing bar with a lunette. The sights are carried separately and are mounted on the mortar only when firing. The shock absorbers are used to protect the sights from firing vibrations and also provide the link between the ordnance and the mount. It is also used when the mounting returns to the loading position after firing. The boom provides stability when firing and also has two winches to convert the mortar from the firing to the traveling configuration.

It is mounted on a wheeled carriage that supports the cradle and barrel much as in a conventional field gun. Unlike most other mortars, there is no bipod. The barrel is mounted at its centre of gravity in trunnions, which allow the barrel to be depressed to the horizontal for loading.

The M-240 has a minimum range of 800 m (2,600 ft) and a maximum range of 9.7 km (6.0 mi). Traverse is limited to 18°, while elevation ranges from +45 to +65°. The sights, elevation and traverse gears are on the left side of the barrel. The mortar is normally towed, at a maximum speed of 40 km/h (25 mph), muzzle first by an AT-P, AT-L or AT-S tractor, which also carries the 11-man crew. Additional vehicles carry the ammunition and emplacing equipment. On arrival at the firing position, which has to be on firm ground, the mortar is uncoupled from the tractor and the towing lunette is removed. The large circular welded baseplate is lowered to the ground and packed with earth to provide a stable firing platform.

The smoothbore barrel is 5.34 m (17.5 ft) (22.25 calibers) long and for loading is swung into the horizontal position. At the lower end of the barrel is the breech-block and projectile guide. Bringing the M-240 into action takes approximately 25 minutes, slightly less to move it after firing. The weight in action is approximately 4,150 kg (9,150 lb). The HE bomb weighs 130 kg (290 lb), of which 34 kg (75 lb) is the explosive payload. The mortar bomb is almost 1.5 m (4 ft 11 in) long, is brought to the mortar on a two-wheeled trolley and a team of five is used for loading. Large tongs/gripping pincers are used to lift the bomb from the trolley onto the projectile guide, with two men on each handle and the fifth steadying the fins. The bomb is then pushed into the barrel and the breech is closed. The barrel is then raised to the firing position. The rate of fire is about 1 round per minute.

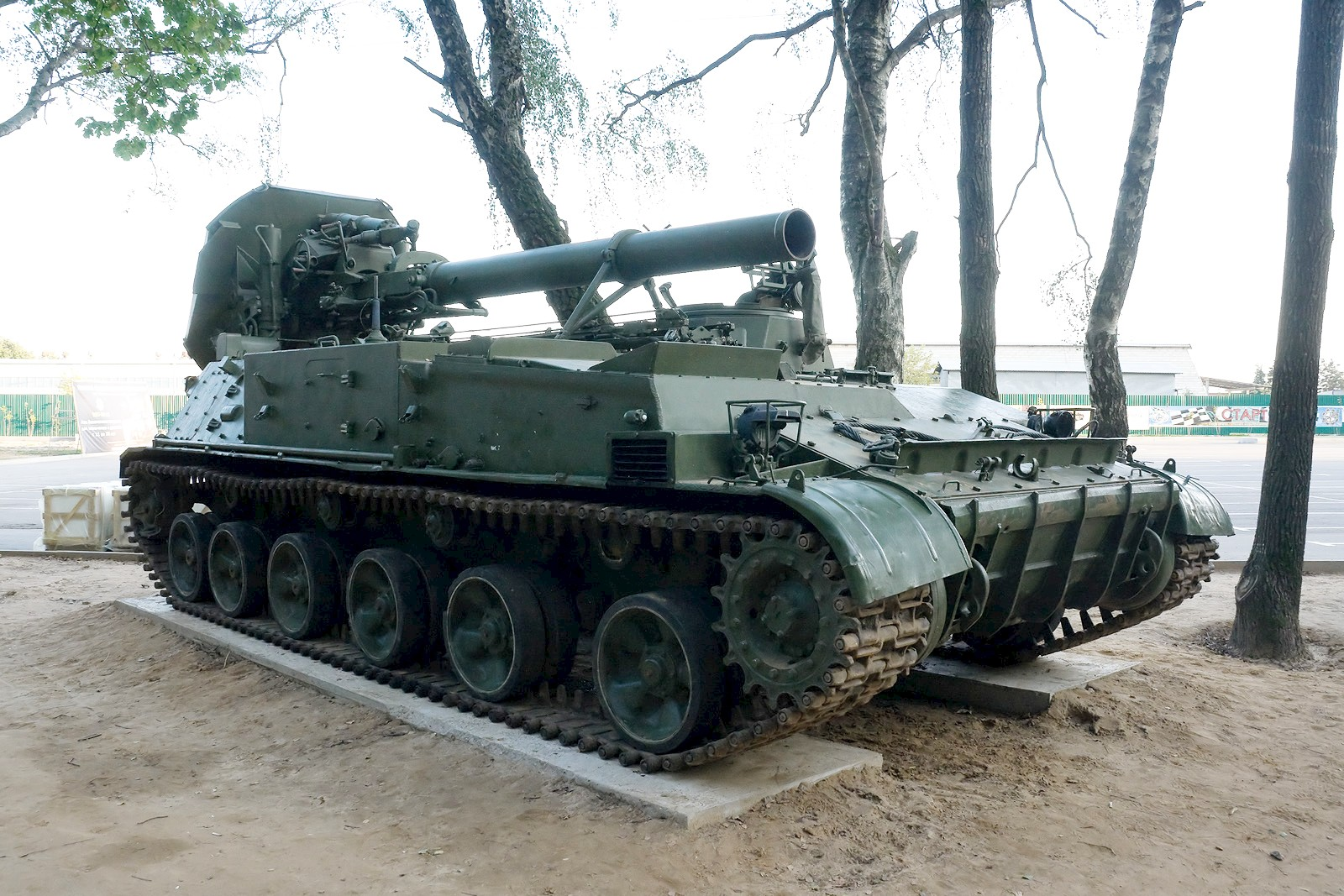
A 2S4 Tyulpan

The self-propelled 2S4 Tyulpan uses a modified version of the M240 mortar designated as the 2B8. It was developed by Yuri N. Kalachnikov at the Perm Machine Building Plant.

=== Specialized munitions ===
In addition to the standard F-864 high-explosive round used by the M240, a number of specialized munitions exist for the 240 mm mortar using 3M15 rocket motors to extend the range to 20 km (12 mi). The variants include:

- 3F2 Gagara (high explosive shell)
- 3O8 Nerpa (cluster munition, carries 14 x O-10 HE-FRAG parachute-retarded submunitions)
- 3B11 (nuclear shell)
- Sayda (incendiary)

The Soviet Union also developed laser-guided "Daredevil" rounds for precision strikes against fortifications.

== Operational history ==
=== Yom Kippur War ===
The Syrian Army deployed 240 mm mortars to the frontline in the Yom Kippur War. On the opening day of the war, they struck the Israeli outposts at Tel Fares and Hermon, succeeding in disrupting Israeli intelligence-gathering and communications. The Egyptian Army also used 240 mm mortars in its assault on the fortifications of the Suez Canal, favoring the heavy shells for destroying Israeli fortifications.

The 240 mm mortars were greatly feared because their enormous warheads were effective even against targets under cover. The Syrian mortars continued to fire on Hermon after the official end of hostilities, and were nicknamed "Goliaths" by Israelis both because of their size, and also after the codename of a concrete underground bunker one of the batteries was firing from. One source implies that a covert Israeli raid was launched to destroy this position.

=== Afghanistan ===
The first use in combat by the Soviet Union of 240 mm mortars was in 1985 during the Soviet intervention in Afghanistan. A battery from the 1074th artillery battalion of the 108th Motor Rifle Division used 240 mm mortars towed by MT-LB tractors against the Muhajeddin forces of Ahmed Shah Massoud in the Charikorskoy and Panjshir valley, including the first use of specialized laser-guided "Daredevil" rounds. After encountering DShK machine gun fire from one of Massoud's fortress, the 240 mm battery engaged the target and destroyed it in 12 to 15 minutes with 5 to 6 rounds, the mortar's high angle of fire proving effective in circumventing the fortress walls where 122 mm howitzer bombardments had previously failed. Troops reported that the mortar was highly accurate and usually a single hit sufficed to destroy a target; furthermore, the heavy shells were little affected by weather conditions. However, the mortar was vulnerable to jamming if the barrel was dirty or damaged.

=== Lebanese Civil War ===
During the Lebanese Civil War, Syrian Army M240 240 mm mortars and S-23 180 mm guns shelled East Beirut in 1989 as part of an offensive to dislodge Christian Lebanese Army faction leader General Michel Aoun, inflicting over 900 casualties.

=== Syrian Civil War ===
The Syrian Army employed towed M240 240 mm mortars in the Syrian Civil War starting in 2012 against the city of Homs, making it the largest mortar weapon employed in contemporary warfare. (Some reports cited the use of 2S4 Tyulpan instead, but their presence has not been confirmed, unlike that of the M240). The use of such heavy weapons in heavy-populated civilian areas was first confirmed from the tail fin of an exploded 240 mm shell in Homs in 2012, raising an outcry from human rights organizations such as Human Rights Watch. Later, videos documented both 240 mm mortars firing and the shells landing on buildings in Syria.

Reports of M240 mortar use became scarce after 2012, possibly because of the depletion of munitions stock; however, in 2015 and 2016, the exploded casings of two dozen rocket-assisted 240 mm shells were identified in the suburbs of Damascus, as well as in East Ghouta and Douma, accompanied by un-exploded O-10 fragmentation cluster munitions, which had never before been confirmed used in combat, causing some to speculate their employment may reflect renewed Russian support.

=== Russian invasion of Ukraine ===
An unknown number of M240 mortars were reactivated by Ukraine and used in the Southern Ukraine campaign and in the Donbas region near Marinka.

== Operators ==
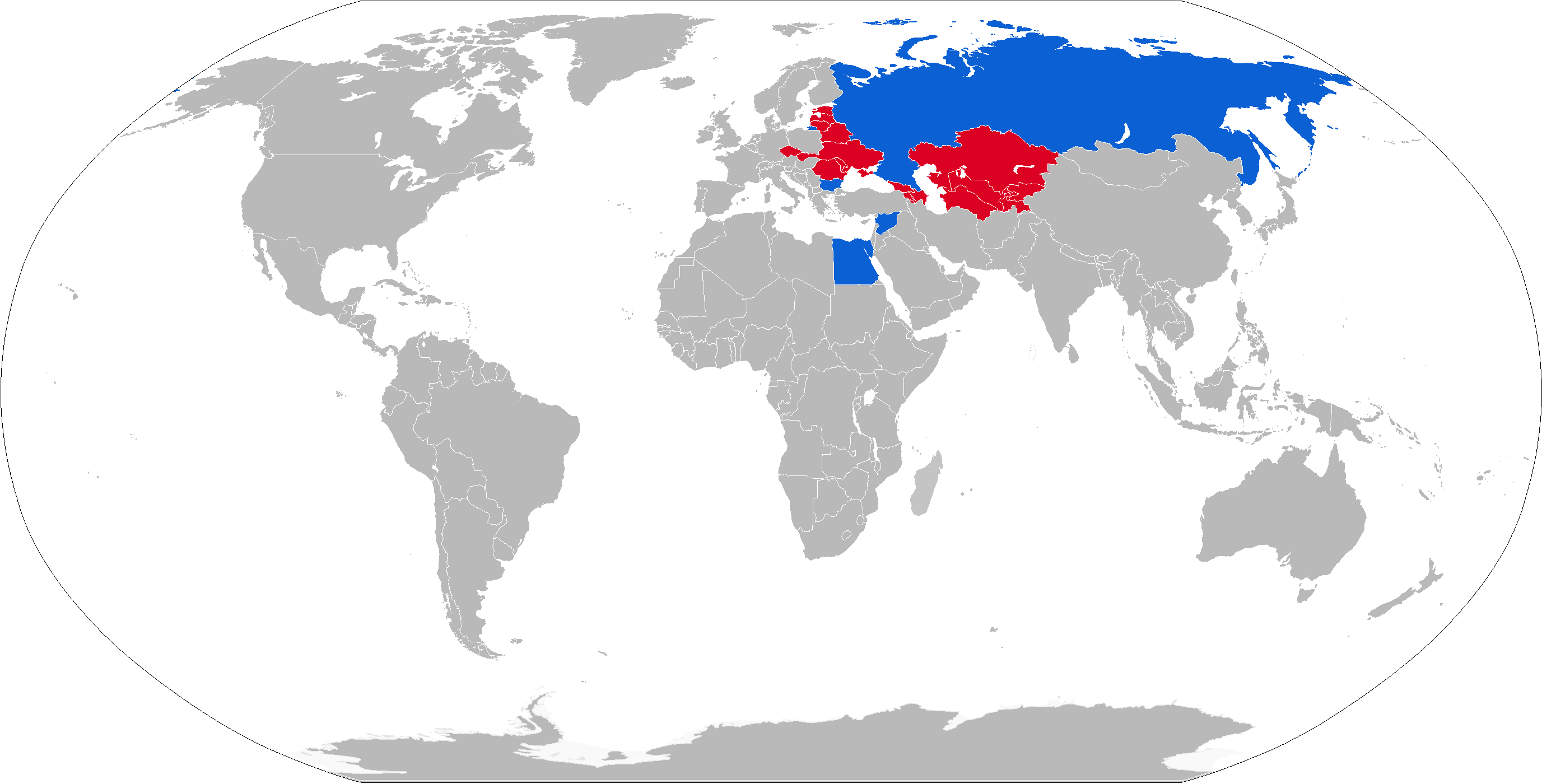
Map with M240 operators in blue with former operators in red

=== Current ===
- Syria − 8 received in 1981, unknown number still in service as of 2024
- Ukraine

=== Former ===
- Iraq − 25 received in 1981, remained in service prior to the 2003 invasion of Iraq
- Romania – At least 12 in 1971, in service from 1953 to 1995
- Soviet Union
