= 180 mm gun S-23 =

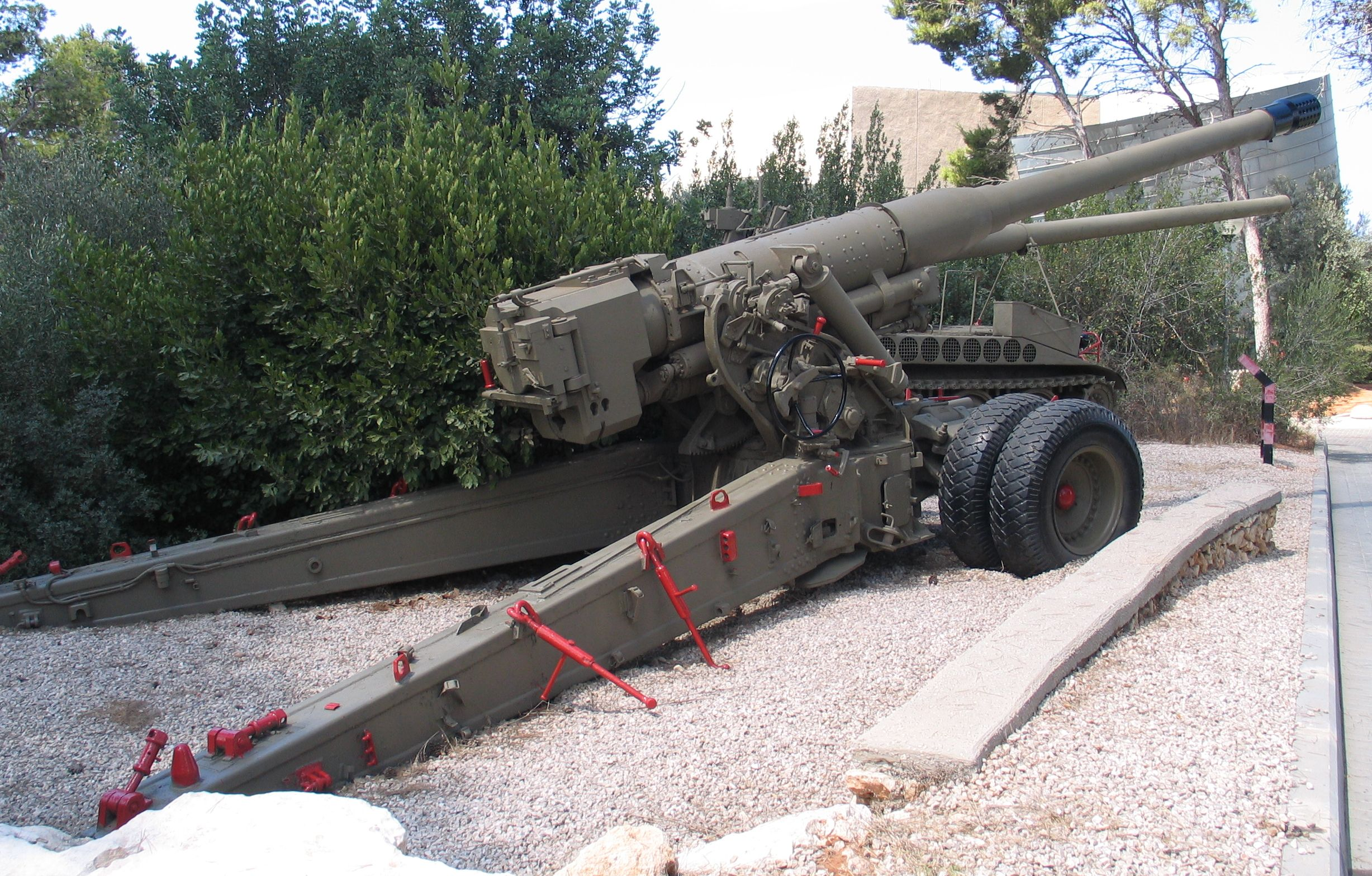
- S-23 in Beyt ha-Totchan Museum, Zikhron Ya'akov.
- Type: Heavy gun
- Place of origin: Soviet Union

Service history
- In service: 1955–2024
- Used by: See Operators
- Wars: Yom Kippur War; Lebanese Civil War; Iran–Iraq War; Syrian civil war

Production history
- Designer: NII-58
- Designed: 1945–1955
- Manufacturer: OAO PO "Barrikady", Volgograd
- Produced: 1955–1971

Specifications
- Mass: 21,450 kg (47,290 lb)
- Length: 10.48 m (34 ft 5 in)
- Barrel length: 8.8 m (28 ft 10 in) L/49
- Width: 2.99 m (9 ft 10 in)
- Height: 2.62 m (8 ft 7 in)
- Crew: 16
- Shell: High Explosive, Nuclear-capable
- Caliber: 180 mm (7.1 in)
- Breech: interrupted screw
- Carriage: split trail
- Elevation: −2° to +50°
- Traverse: 44°
- Rate of fire: 1 rpm maximum; 1 round every two minutes sustained
- Muzzle velocity: 850 m/s (2,800 ft/s)
- Effective firing range: 30.4 km (18.9 mi)
- Maximum firing range: 43.8 km (27.2 mi) with RAP
- Sights: S-85 mechanical sight, PG-1M panoramic sight and MVShP direct sight

The 180 mm gun S-23 (Russian: 180-мм пушка С-23) was a Soviet heavy gun of Cold War era. It was developed in the early 1950s, with the design based on naval guns. Its first public appearance was the 1955 May Day parade in Moscow. For some time, it was believed in the West that the S-23 was actually a 203 mm weapon, and as a result it was often referred to as the 203 mm M1955 gun howitzer. However, after an example was captured in the Middle East during the 1970s this misconception was dispelled.

== Design history ==
The S-23 was designed by NII-58 as part of a new series of heavy artillery systems consisting of the following types:

- the 180 mm gun S-23;
- a 210 mm howitzer S-23-I a.k.a. S-33;
- a 280 mm mortar S-23-II a.k.a. S-43 and
- a 203 mm gun howitzer S-23-IV.

All were to be based on the same carriage. The order to start series production was given but after the production of seven S-23s (GRAU index: 52-P-572), one S-33 and one S-43 by PO "Barrikady" in 1955 the project was cancelled. The seven guns remained in service until 1967 and were regularly shown during the annual May Day parades, being towed by AT-T artillery tractors. At the request of Syria, who needed a large-calibre gun system, the project was shortly revived at the end of the 1960s and twelve more S-23 guns were produced in 1971, as well as the new VOF28 round with RAP projectile OF-23. The other rounds were the VF-572 with HE projectile F-572 and the VG-572 with concrete-piercing projectile G-572.

== Operational history ==
The West assumed that the S-23 was issued within the Soviet Army at a ratio of 12 weapons per heavy artillery brigade. It was exported to Syria and some sources suggest that it might have been exported to other Middle Eastern countries, and likely the Indian Army. The howitzer is believed to be seeing use by the Syrian Army in the Syrian Civil War.

=== Yom Kippur War ===
180mm S-23 guns were deployed to forward positions as part of the Syrian Army's General Staff reserve during the Yom Kippur War. In the opening day of the war, they shelled Mount Canaan, an intelligence base near Safed, and Mahanayim airfield. This early shelling succeeded in disrupting Israeli intelligence installations and communications.

=== Lebanese Civil War ===
During the Lebanese Civil War, Syrian Army 180mm guns and 240mm mortars shelled East Beirut in 1989 as part of an offensive to dislodge Christian faction leader Michel Aoun, inflicting over 900 casualties.

== Operators ==
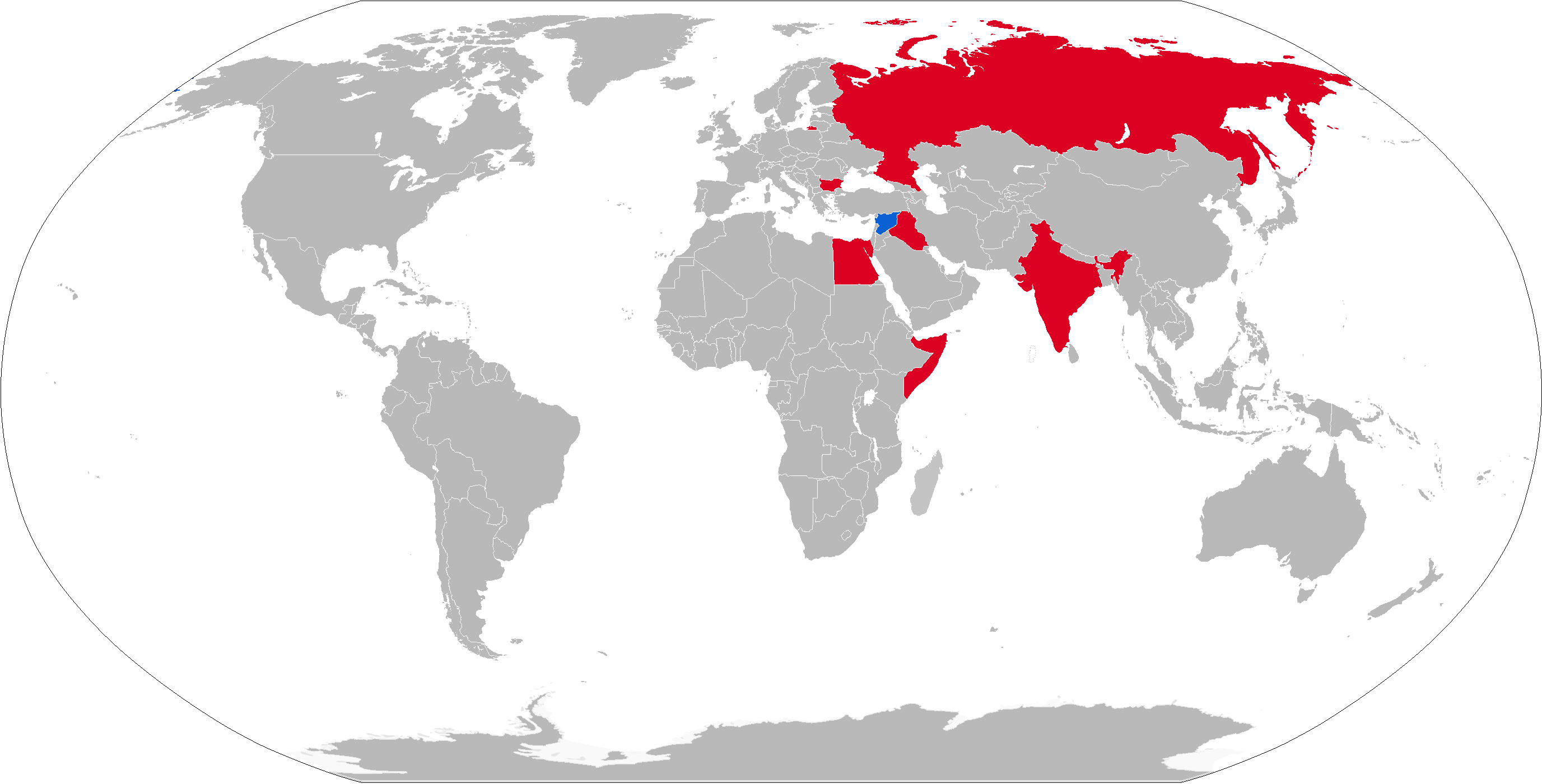
Map with S23 operators in blue and former operators in red

=== Former ===
- Egypt − 50
- India − 40
- Soviet Union − 180
- Syria − 36

== Photo gallery ==
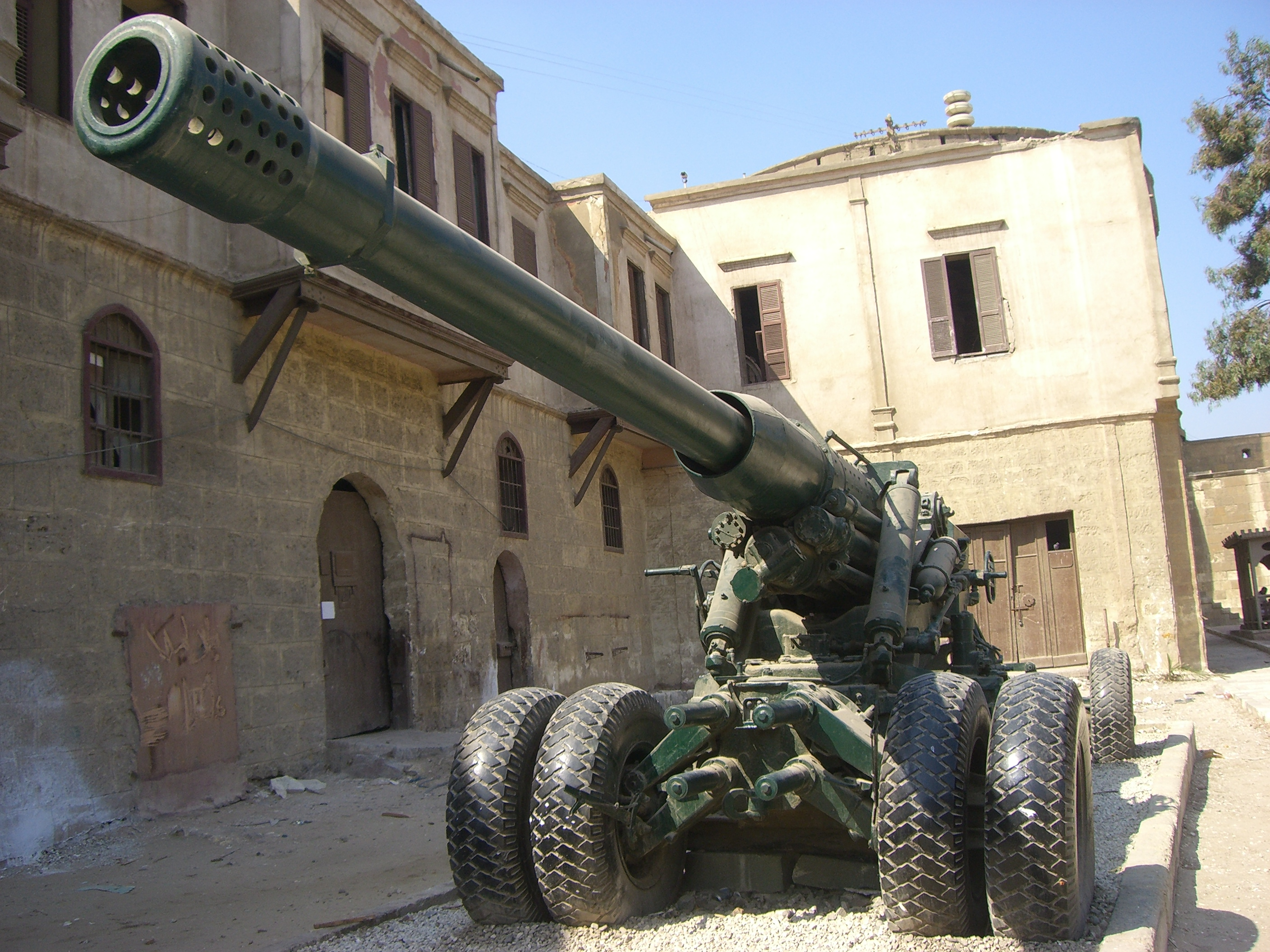
S-23 in the Cairo Citadel, Egypt

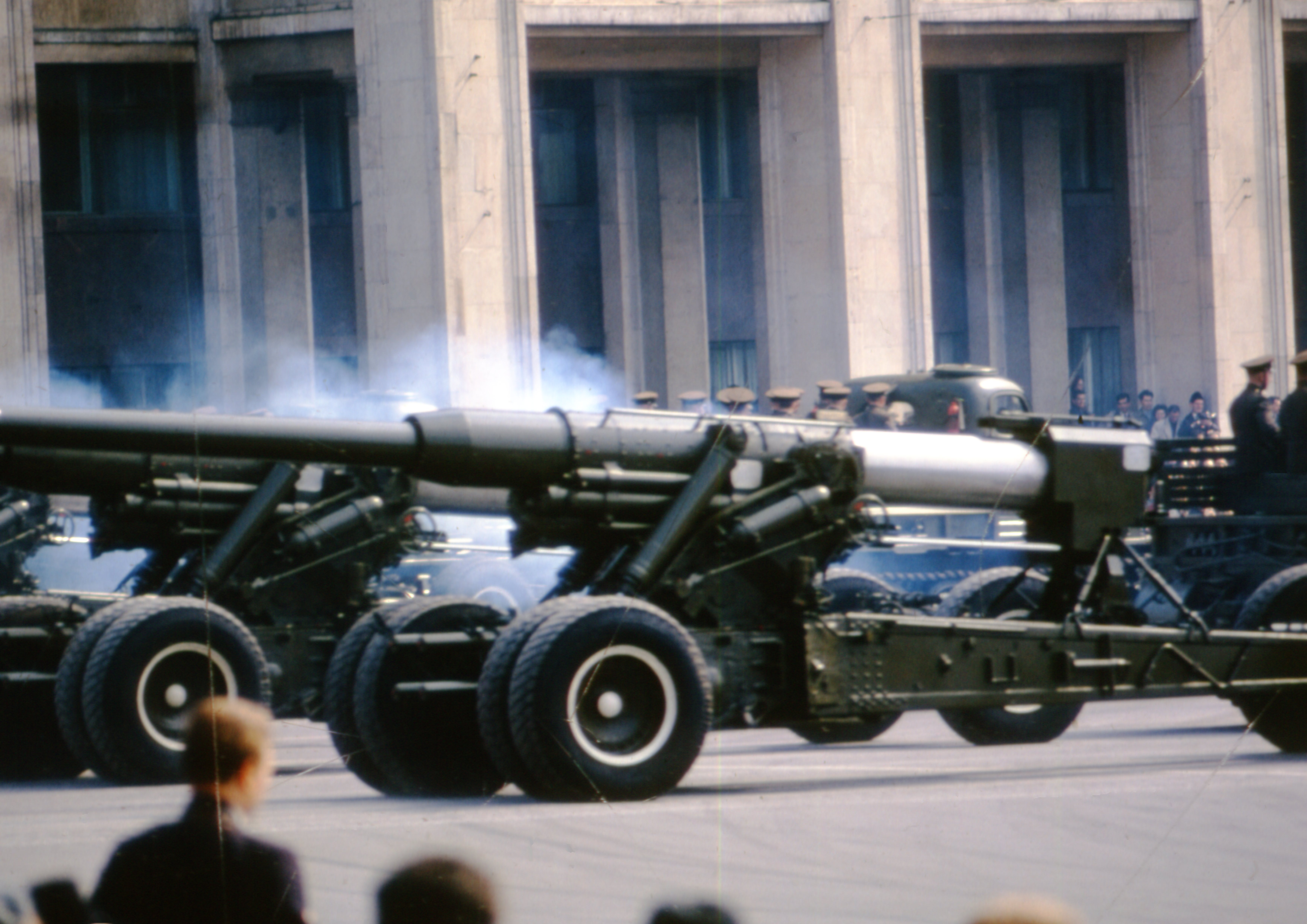
S-23s in traveling configuration towed with AT-T heavy artillery tractors on a May Day parade in Moscow, 1964.

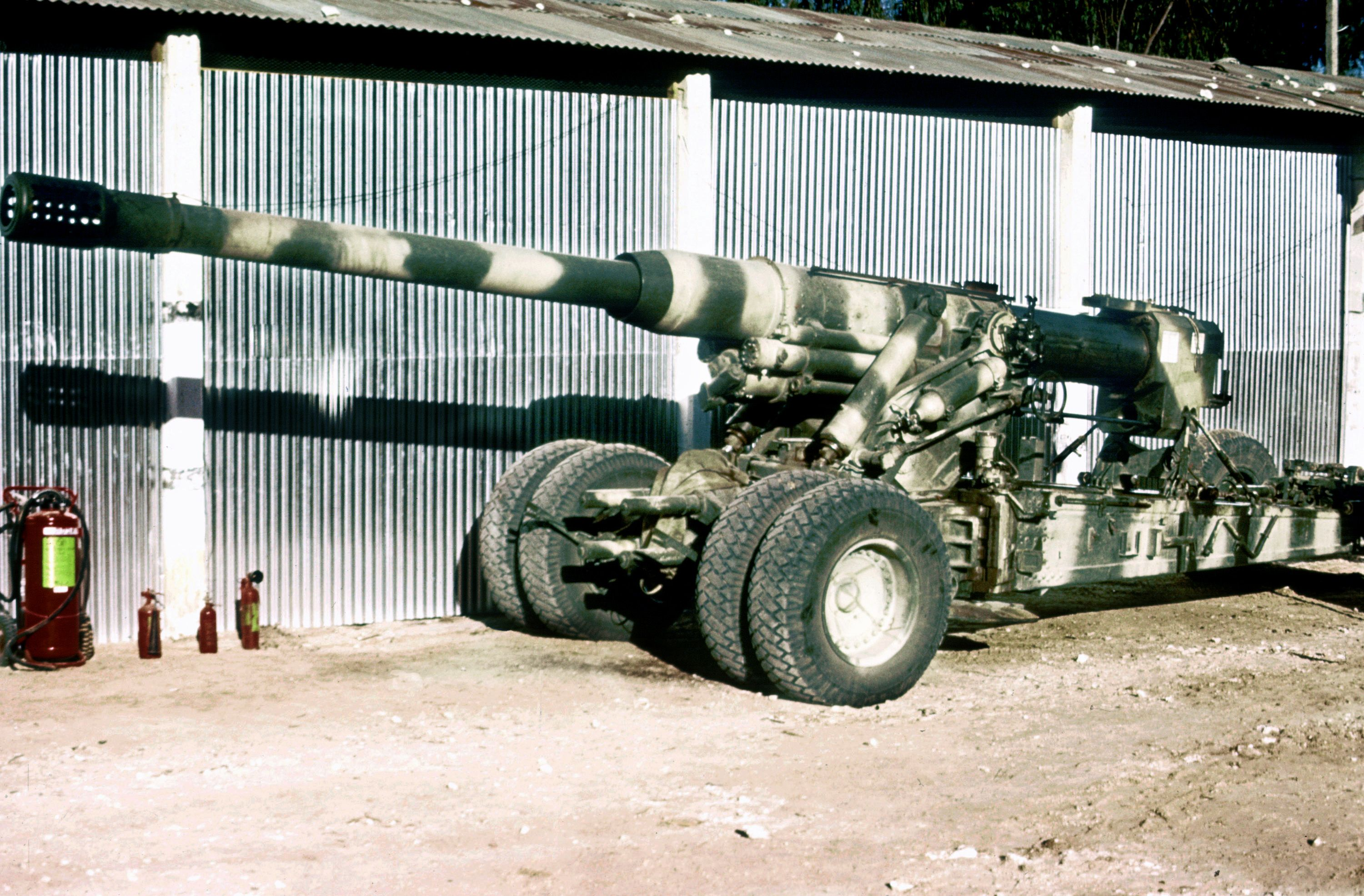
Right-side view of an S-23.

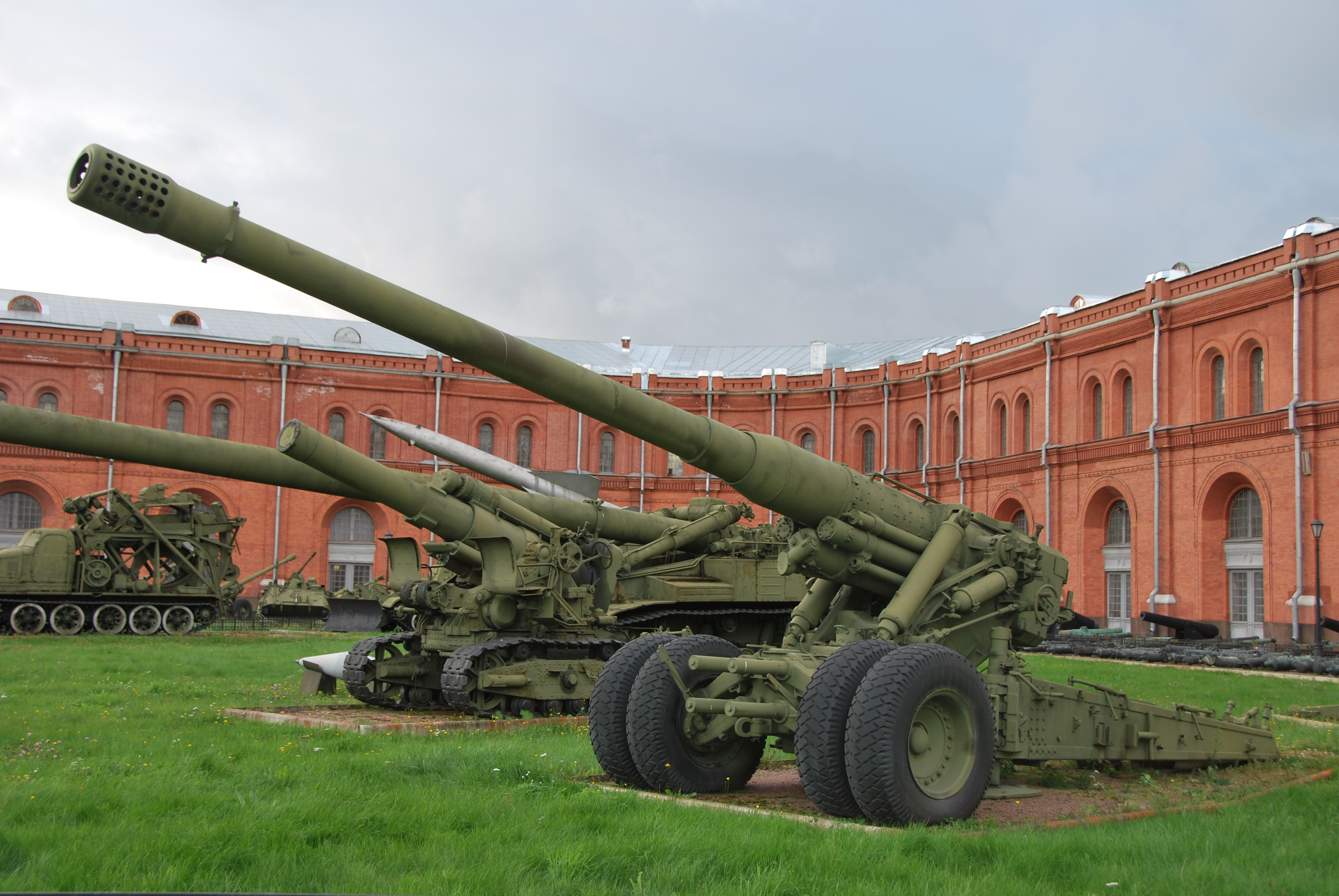
S-23 in the museum for signals troops and artillery, St Petersburg.

== Sources ==
- Shirokograd A.B. (2000). Entsiklopediya otechestvennoj artillerii. Harvest.
- International Institute for Strategic Studies (2024). "Chapter Six: Middle East and North Africa". The Military Balance. 124 (1). Taylor & Francis: 328–395. doi:10.1080/04597222.2024.2298594.
