= 2A3 Kondensator 2P =

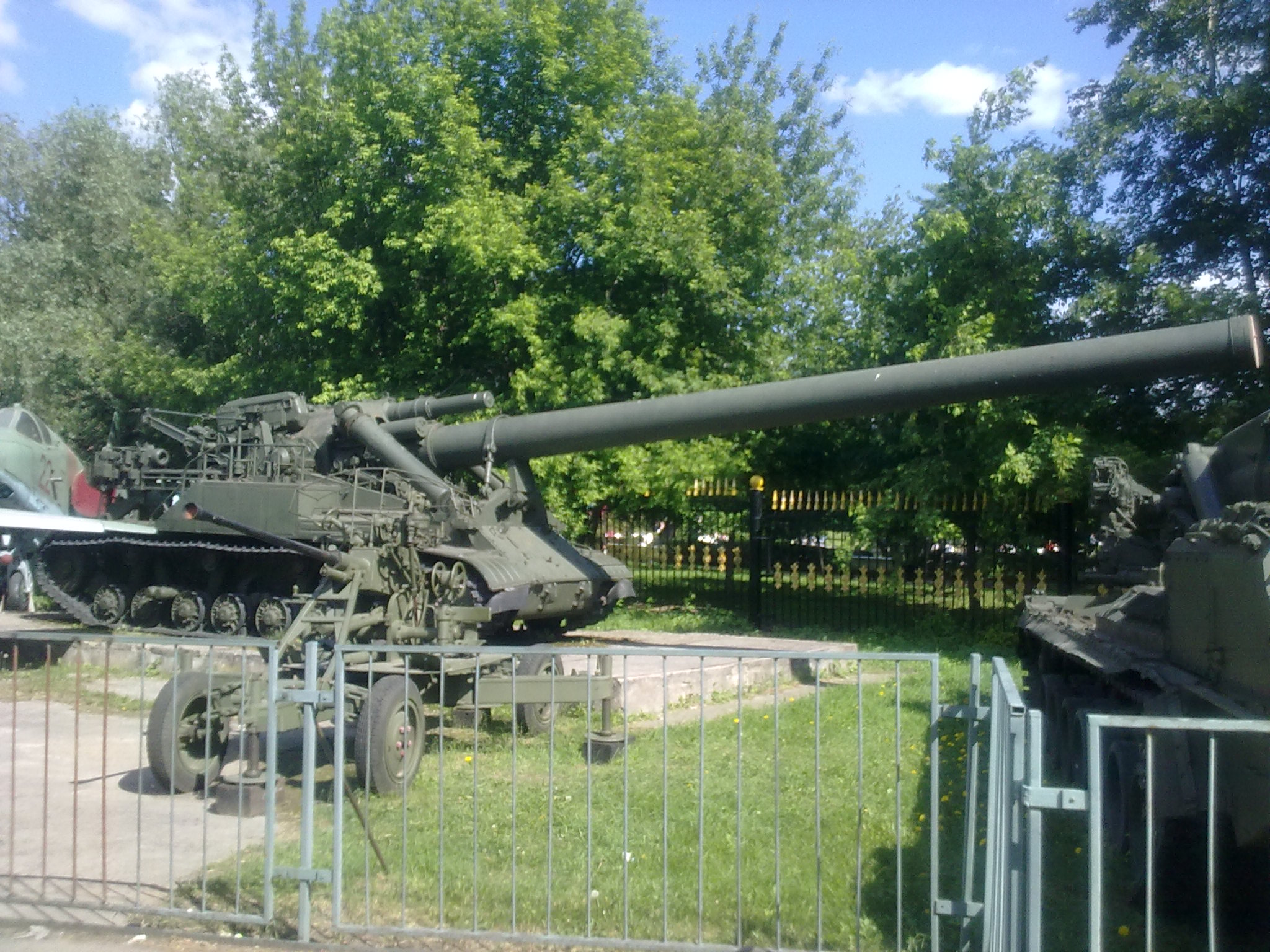
- 2A3 Kondensator
- Type: Self-propelled howitzer
- Place of origin: Soviet Union

Service history
- In service: 1956–1960
- Used by: Soviet Union

Production history
- No. built: 1 prototype + 4 serial production

Specifications
- Mass: 64 t (63 long tons; 71 short tons)
- Length: 20.00 m (65 ft 7 in)
- Width: 3.08 m (10 ft 1 in)
- Height: 5.75 m (18 ft 10 in)
- Crew: 8
- Caliber: 406 mm (16.0 in)
- Rate of fire: 1 round per 5 minutes
- Maximum firing range: 25.6 km (15.9 mi)
- Operational range: 200 km (120 mi)
- Maximum speed: 30 km/h (19 mph)

The 2A3 Kondensator 2P (Russian: 2А3 «Конденсатор» – "Condenser" or "Capacitor") was a Soviet 406 mm self-propelled howitzer. Its GRAU designation is 2A3.

== Development ==
The 2A3 originated during the Cold War as a response to the United States' new "Pentomic Division" tactical doctrine that emphasized heavy use of tactical nuclear weapons, including nuclear artillery. The US M65 atomic cannon was introduced in 1952 and deployed in Germany in 1953. The Soviet Union started its own program to develop a 406mm self-propelled howitzer capable of firing nuclear projectiles, codenamed Objekt 271.

Grabin Design Bureau completed the artillery system in 1955. The 'Objekt 271' chassis from the Kotlin Design Bureau in Leningrad was completed soon thereafter. The unified system received the military industrial designation 2A3 and was completed in 1956 at the Kirov Works in Leningrad. Total production only amounted to four vehicles.

Western observers got their first look at the new weapon during a 1957 parade on Red Square. Initially, observers thought that the weapon was a mockup created for deterrent effect.

Kondensator had an exceptionally short service life. Following a period of extensive testing, the weapons were assigned to the Artillery High Command reserve. There they remained in service until the military reforms of Nikita Khrushchev were enacted, favoring more effective missile systems over the super-heavy artillery and heavy tanks of the Stalinist era.

In the mid-1960s, all four Kondensator howitzers were officially retired, with one of these formidable weapons finding a lasting place on a static display at the Central Armed Forces Museum in Moscow.

== See also ==
- 2B1 Oka
- List of the largest cannon by caliber
