= 2B1 Oka =

Soviet heavy self-propelled mortar

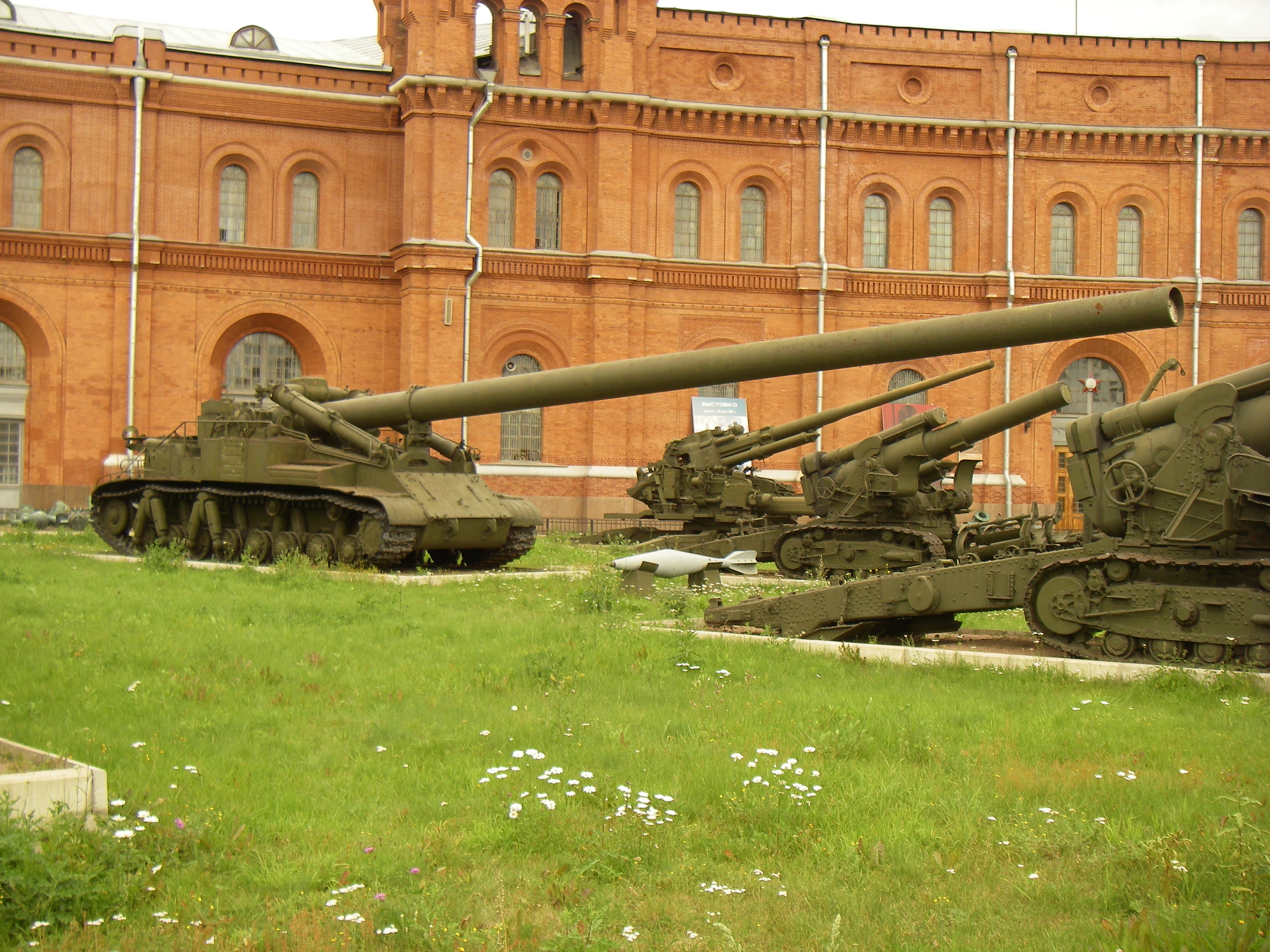
- Type: Self-propelled heavy mortar
- Place of origin: Soviet Union

Production history
- Manufacturer: Barrikady Plant
- Produced: 1957
- No. built: 4

Specifications
- Mass: 55.3 t (54.4 long tons; 61.0 short tons)
- Barrel length: 20.02 m (65.7 ft)
- Width: 3.08 m (10.1 ft)
- Height: 5.73 m (18.8 ft)
- Crew: 1+6
- Caliber: 420 mm (17 in)
- Recoil: None
- Rate of fire: 1 round per 5 minutes
- Maximum firing range: 25–45 km (16–28 mi)
- Main armament: 420 mm (17 in) smoothbore mortar
- Engine: Modified V12-6B diesel 750 kW (1,010 hp)
- Transmission: Planetary, 8 speed
- Operational range: 200–220 km (120–140 mi)
- Maximum speed: 30 km/h (19 mph)

2B1 Oka, (Russian: "2Б1 Ока" - "Oka River"), is a Soviet 420 mm (17 in) self-propelled heavy mortar. 2B1 is its GRAU designation. It was designed to deliver tactical nuclear payloads, but it was plagued by technical issues caused by the sheer size of the gun and the massive recoil during firing. With the advances in tactical ballistic missile technology, development of the Oka was cancelled in 1960 before it could enter service.

== Background ==
In 1954, the USSR began work on developing nuclear artillery. The program featured three different self-propelled guns based on the chassis of the T-10 tank: the 2A3 Kondensator 406 mm (16.0 in) gun, the 2B1 Oka 420 mm breech-loaded mortar, and the 420 mm S-103 recoilless rifle. While the development of the S-103 was abandoned in November 1956 after the barrel burst during the 93rd test firing, four Okas and four Kondensators were built in 1957.

== Description ==
The Oka, originally known as the SM-58 was developed and built by the Barrikady Plant in Stalingrad. An experimental model was ready in 1957. Its chassis (Object 273), designed and built by the Kirov Plant in Leningrad, was based on the chassis and components of the T-10M heavy tank with reinforced torsion bars and a system of suspension locks to provide firing stability. While the Oka chassis is superficially identical to the Kondensator, they have different cab arrangements. While the 2A3 features a large, but narrow tandem cab mounted above the right front track guard, the 2B1 has a large full width cab mounted at the front of the vehicle.

According to Zaloga, the Soviets developed two tactical nuclear rounds for the Oka: the Transformator-AR and the Transformator-D, both based on the RDS-9 nuclear torpedo warhead. It weighed 650 kg (1,430 lb) and had a maximum range of 25 km (16 mi). Kinnear and Sewell note that some sources claim that the Oka could fire 750 kg (1,650 lb) rounds up to 45 km (28 mi). Like the 2A3, rate of fire of the 2B1 is low, limited to one round every five minutes.

During field tests neither the Kondensator nor the Oka performed well: both vehicles were too wide to cross bridges or to transport through the Soviet railway system while their exceptionally long barrels also proved problematic during transport. The 2B1, designed to be fired with the barrel at high elevations didn't suffer the same problems from the extreme recoil as the 2A3 (which caused the entire vehicle to be pushed back several meters when its gun was fired), but it still placed enormous stress on the chassis, despite the installation of reinforced shock absorbers.

The 2A3 and 2B1 technical problems combined with Nikita Khrushchev's preference for missiles over heavy guns resulted in both designs being cancelled in 1960, before they could ever be put into service, although both vehicles were paraded through Red Square in the late 1950s to leave an impression on foreign military attachés and the international press. The Soviet Army instead introduced into service tactical ballistic missiles, such as the 2K1 Mars and 2K6 Luna systems (known in the west as the FROG systems) and the R-11 Zemlya and R-17 Elbrus (known in the west as the Scud) armed with nuclear warheads.

== See also ==
- 2A3 Kondensator 2P
- List of the largest cannon by caliber

== Sources ==
- Kinnear, James; Sewell, Stephen (2017). Soviet T-10 Heavy Tank and Variants. Bloomsbury Publishing. ISBN 978-1-4728-2053-2.
- Zaloga, Steven J. (2018). Superguns 1854–1991: Extreme artillery from the Paris Gun and the V-3 to Iraq's Project Babylon. Bloomsbury Publishing. ISBN 978-1-4728-2609-1.
