= 16-inch/50-caliber Mark 7 gun =

406 mm naval gun

16"/50 caliber Mark 7 gun
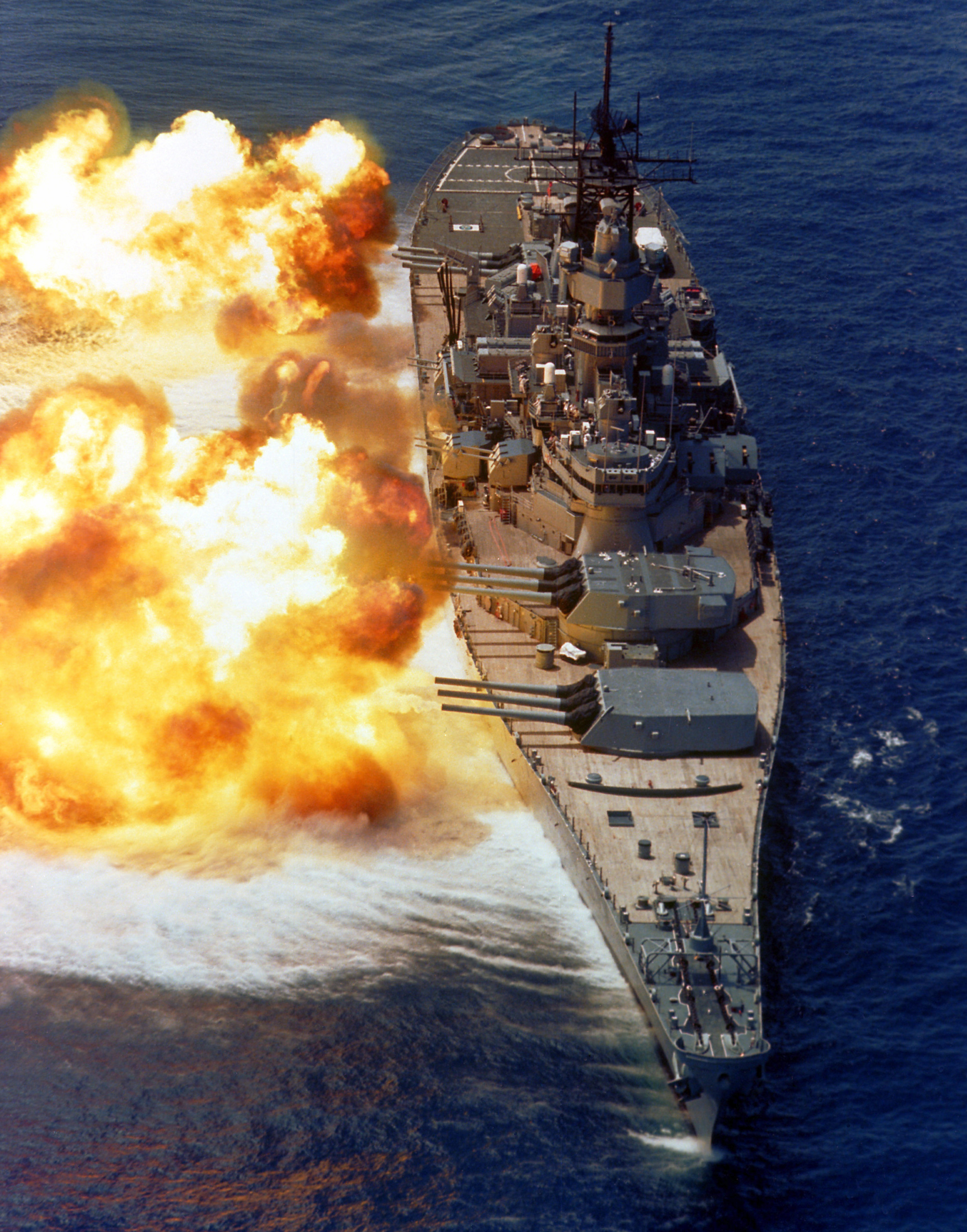
- The Iowa-class battleship USS Iowa fires a full broadside of her 16"/50 (406 mm) Mark 7 guns. The roiling water caused by the stupendous muzzle blast creates an illusion of the ship moving sideways from the guns' recoil.
- Type: Naval gun
- Place of origin: United States

Service history
- In service: 1943–1992
- Used by: U.S. Navy
- Wars: World War II; Korean War; Vietnam War; Lebanese Civil War; Gulf War

Production history
- Designed: 1939

Specifications
- Mass: 267,904 lb (121,519 kg; 121.519 t) (including breech)
- Length: 816 in (68.0 ft; 20.7 m)
- Barrel length: 800 in (67 ft; 20 m) (50 calibers)
- Shell: AP Mark 8: 2,700 lb (1,225 kg); HC Mark 13: 1,900 lb (862 kg); Nuclear Mark 23 (W23): 1,900 lb (862 kg)
- Caliber: 16 in (406 mm)
- Muzzle velocity: AP: 2,500 ft/s (762 m/s); HC & Nuclear: 2,690 ft/s (820 m/s)
- Maximum firing range: (24.047 mi (38.700 km) (on Battleship mount)

The 16"/50 caliber Mark 7 – United States Naval Gun is the main armament of the Iowa-class battleships and was the planned main armament of the canceled Montana-class battleship.

== Description ==
A cutaway of a turret mounting 16-inch guns

Inside of one of USS Missouri's 16-inch guns during firing in 1988

Due to a lack of communication during design in 1938, the Bureau of Ordnance assumed the Iowa class would use the 16-inch (406 mm)/50 Mark 2 guns constructed for the 1920 South Dakota-class battleships and Lexington-class battlecruisers. However, the Bureau of Construction and Repair assumed that the ships would carry a compact 16-in/50 turret and designed the ships with barbettes too small to accommodate the 16-in/50 Mark 2 three-gun turret that the Bureau of Ordnance was actually working on. The lightweight 16-in/50 Mark 7 was designed to resolve this conflict.

These guns were 50 calibers long, 50 times their 16-inch (406 mm) bore diameter with barrels 66.7 ft (20.3 m) long, from chamber to muzzle. Each gun weighed about 239,000 lb (108 t) without the breech, and 267,900 lb (121.5 t) with the breech. They fired projectiles weighing from 1,900 to 2,700 lb (860 to 1,220 kg) at different muzzle velocities, depending on the projectile. When firing armor-piercing projectiles, their muzzle velocity was 2,500 feet per second (760 m/s) with a range of up to 24 mi (39 km). At maximum range the projectile spent almost 1 1/2 minutes in flight. Each turret required a crew of 79 men to operate. The turrets cost US$1.4 million each, excluding the cost of the guns.

The turrets were described as "three-gun" rather than "triple" because each barrel could be elevated independently. The ships could fire any combination of their guns, up to a broadside of all nine. The turret interiors were subdivided and designed to permit the independent loading, elevation and firing of each gun. Each turret was fitted with an optical range finder, ballistic analog computer, and a switchboard. The rangefinder and ballistic computer permitted the turret's gun captain and crew to locally engage targets should battle damage disrupt communication with the ship's primary or auxiliary fire control centers. The firing switchboard allowed any remaining fire control computer to send data to or control the firing computers of other turrets in the event of battle damage to the primary and secondary artillery plotting rooms.

Contrary to popular belief, (Note: For instance, in his 2007 book Sea of Thunder: Four Naval Commanders and the Last Sea War, Evan Thomas states "... the New Jersey could throw nine tons of munitions almost fifteen miles in a single broadside. The recoil from its main battery pushed the 45,000-ton ship ten feet sideways." As recent as in 2022, retired Navy Admiral James G. Foggo III reiterated this myth in 2022 in a Insider Inc. Youtube video.) the ships did not move sideways noticeably when a broadside was fired; this was an illusion. With the enormous mass of the vessel and the damping effect of the water around the hull, the pressure wave generated by the gunfire was felt as just a slight change in lateral velocity. The sea surface on the side of the ship to which the guns are trained is roiled by the guns' muzzle blast, which creates the illusion of motion in still photos.

The guns could be elevated from −5 degrees to +45 degrees, moving at up to 12 degrees per second. The turrets could rotate about 300 degrees at about 4 degrees per second and could be fired back beyond the beam, sometimes called firing "over the shoulder". A red stripe on the wall of each turret, inches from the railing, marked the limit of the gun's recoil as a safety warning to the turret's crew.

Complementing the 16-in/50 caliber Mark 7 gun was a fire control computer, the Ford Instrument Company Mark 8 Range Keeper. This analog computer was used to direct the fire from the battleship's big guns, taking into account factors including the speed of the targeted ship, the projectile's travel time, and air resistance. At the time the Montana class was set to begin construction, the range keepers had gained the ability to use radar data to direct fire. The results of this advance were telling: the range keeper was able to track and fire at targets at greater range and with increased accuracy, day or night. This gave the US Navy a major advantage in the latter half of WWII, as the Japanese did not develop radar or automated fire control to the level of the US Navy. With a few exceptions, such as the Japanese battleship Yamato, Japanese warships at best used basic radar sets that were not connected to fire control, still relying on optical rangefinders. Even the few Japanese warships that had radar-assisted guns did not directly link their fire control and radar, having to input the locations of targets spotted on radar into the fire control manually.

The 16"/50 caliber's advanced fire control was designed to allow it to fire accurately at its maximum range, which exceeded any opposing ship's effective firing range. However, this proved not to be possible. The US soon learned that projectile dispersion was not something fire control, no matter how advanced, could solve (this remains true: modern guns with more advanced radar cannot fire accurately from maximum range, being limited to a shorter accurate effective range). Several live-firing tests were conducted by Iowa-class battleships in which the 16"/50 displayed shockingly low hit rates from the extreme ranges; it was designed to fight from shorter range, even with its very advanced radar. Most notably USS Iowa bombarded the former battleship target Nevada over five days, with an extremely low hit rate, failing to sink the target ship, demonstrating that a ship armed with these guns could not fire accurately at an enemy ship while remaining out of range of the enemy's guns.

During their reactivation in the 1980s, the up-to-date Mark 160 Fire Control System was used to guide the fire of the Iowa-class battleship Mark 7 guns.

== Construction ==
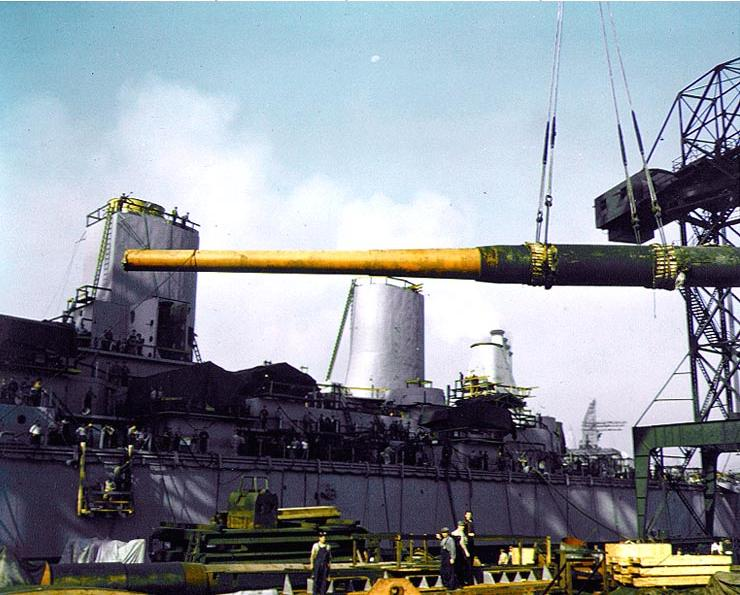
Yard workers hoist one of nine 16"/50 Mark VII gun barrels aboard the USS Iowa during her construction in 1942.

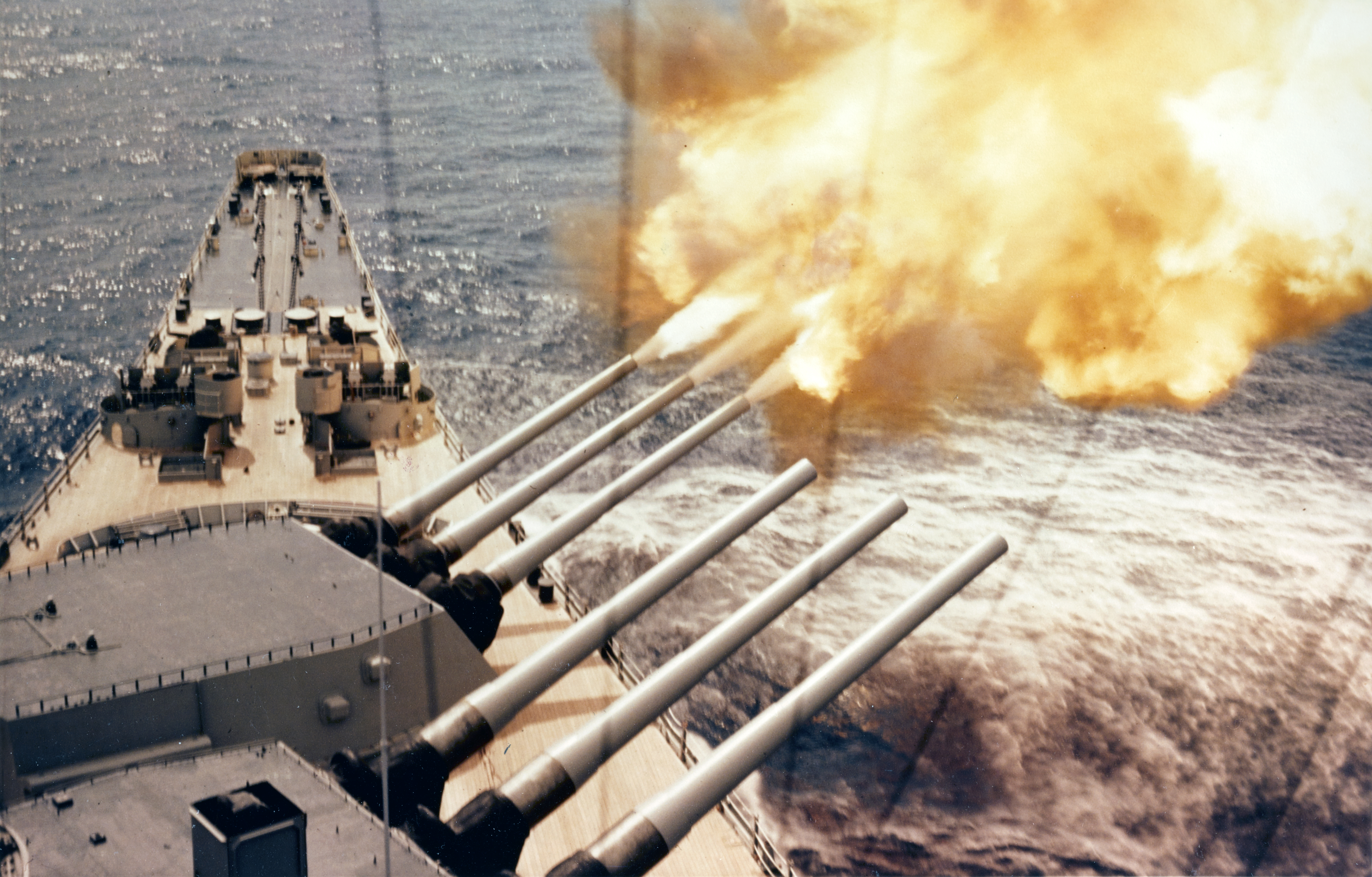
The 16-inch/50 caliber Mark 7 guns of the forward turret of the battleship USS Wisconsin (BB-64) fire at enemy targets ashore on the Korean Peninsula on 30 January 1952 during the Korean War.

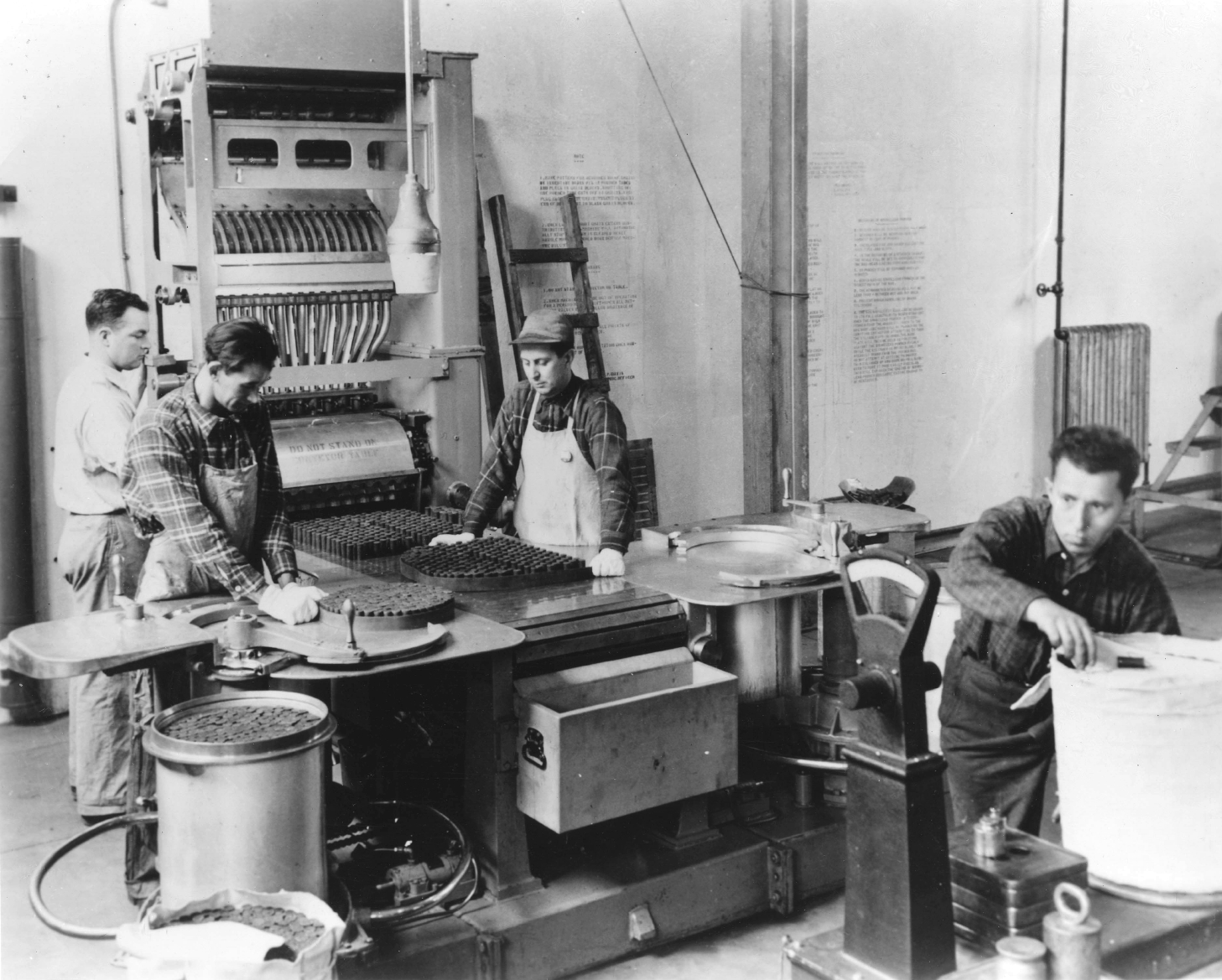
Employees working with the automatic 16-inch powder stacking machine at Naval Ammunition Depot Hingham, Mass. during World War II.

The Mark 7 gun was a built-up gun and was constructed of liner, tube, jacket, three hoops, two locking rings, tube and liner locking ring, yoke ring and screw box liner. Some components were autofretted. Typical of United States naval weapons built in the 1940s, the bore was chromium-plated for longer barrel life. It had a Welin breech block that opened downwards and was hydraulically operated. The screw box liner and breech plug was segmented with stepped screw threads arranged in fifteen sectors of 24 degrees each.

Gun characteristics
| Designation | 16-in/50 caliber (406 mm × 20.3 m) Mark 7 |
| Ship class(es) used on | Iowa (BB-61) and Montana (BB-67) classes |
| Date of design | 1939 |
| Date entered service | 1943 |
| Gun weight | 267,904 lb (121,519 kg) (including breech); 239,156 lb (108,479 kg) (without breech) |
| Gun length | 816 in (68.0 ft; 20.7 m) (breech face to muzzle) |
| Bore length | 800 in (67 ft; 20 m) |
| Rifling length | 682.86 in (56.905 ft; 17.345 m) |
| Grooves | (96) 0.150 in (3.8 mm) deep |
| Lands | N/A |
| Twist | Uniform RH 1 in 25 |
| Chamber volume | 27,000 cu in (440,000 cm^{3}) |
| Rate of fire | 2 rounds per minute |
| Range | 41,622 yd (38.059 km; 20.550 nmi) with nominal 660 lb (300 kg) powder charge |
| Muzzle velocity | 2,690 ft/s (820 m/s) with 1,900 lb (860 kg) HC (High Capacity) shell and 2,500 ft/s (760 m/s) with 2,700 lb (1,200 kg) AP (Armor Piercing) shell |
| Muzzle energy | 290 MJ (81 kWh) for the light projectile and 355 MJ (99 kWh) for the heavy projectile. |

== Mark 8 "Super-heavy" shell ==
The Mark 7 gun was originally intended to fire the 2,240-pound (1,020 kg) Mark 5 armor-piercing shell. However, the shell-handling system for these guns was redesigned to use the "super-heavy" 2,700-pound (1,200 kg) APCBC (Armor Piercing, Capped, Ballistic Capped) Mark 8 shell before any of the Iowa-class battleship's keels were laid down. The large-caliber guns were designed to fire either an armor-piercing round for anti-ship and anti-structure work, and a high-explosive round for use against unarmored targets and shore bombardment.

The North Carolina and South Dakota classes could also fire the 2,700-pound Mark 8 shell with the 16"/45 caliber Mark 6 gun, although with a shorter range. The Mark 6 gun was not as heavy as the Mark 7, which helped both battleship classes to conform to the limits of the Washington Naval Treaty. However, the two treaty-era battleships fired their shells at a lower muzzle velocity, which made their plunging fire superior to that of the 16"/50 caliber gun.

The Mark 8 shells gave the North Carolina, South Dakota, and Iowa classes the second-heaviest broadside of all battleship classes, even though the first two ship classes were treaty battleships, exceeded only by the Yamato-class battleships.

Each D839 propellant (smokeless powder) grain used for full charges for this gun was 2 in (51 mm) long, 1 in (25 mm) in diameter and had seven perforations, each 0.060 in (1.5 mm) in diameter with a web thickness range of 0.193 to 0.197 in (4.9 to 5.0 mm) between the perforations and the grain diameter. A maximum charge consisted of six silk bags (hence the term "bag gun"), each filled with 110 lb (50 kg) of propellant.

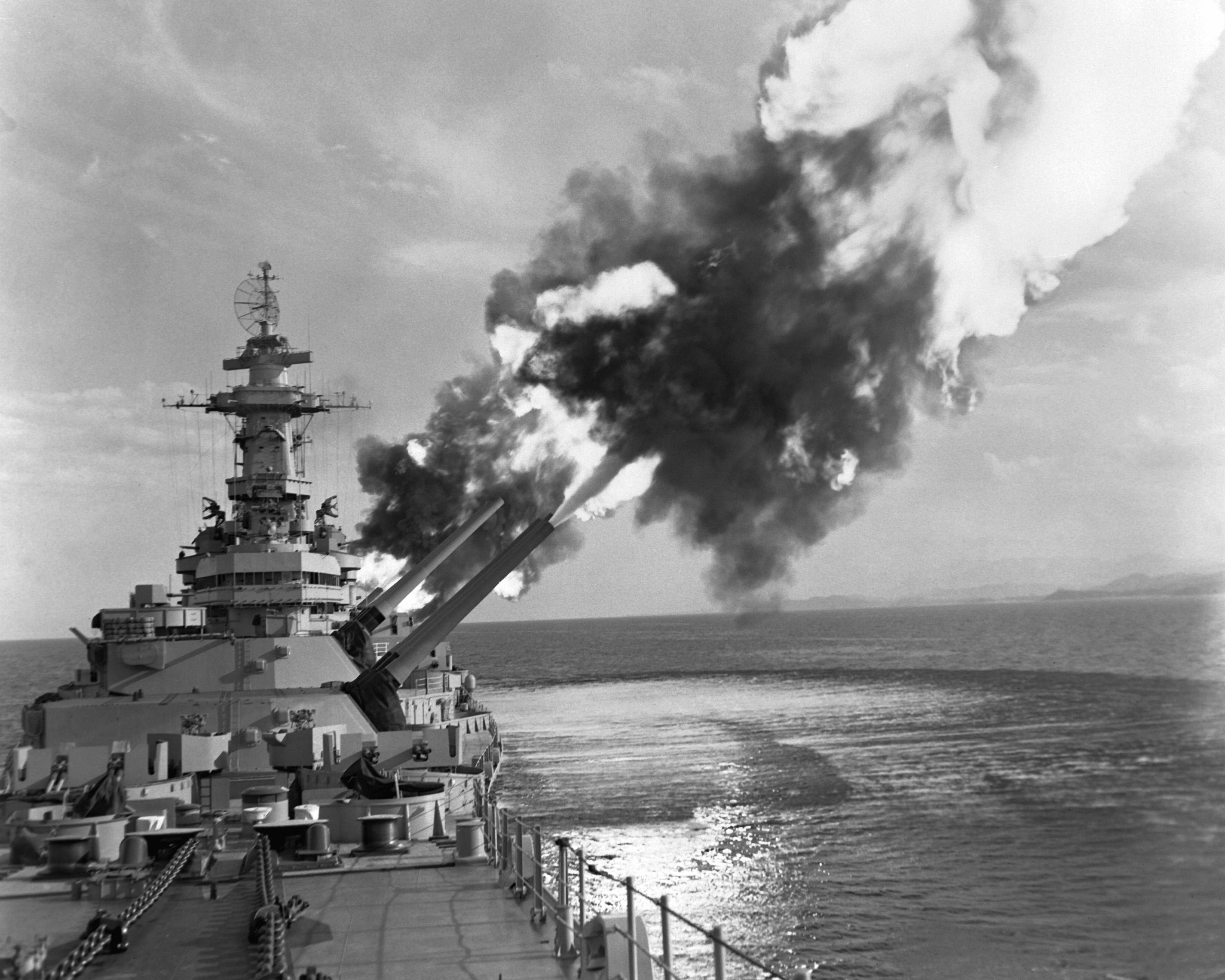
USS New Jersey (BB-62) fires a full 9-gun salvo in January 1953.

== Service history ==
Off of Truk Atoll on 16 February 1944, Iowa and New Jersey engaged the Japanese destroyer Nowaki at a range of 35,700 yards (20.3 mi) and straddled (one shot on Nowaki's port side, and the second on her starboard), setting the record for the longest-ranged straddle in history (although not a single hit was claimed). Some reports indicated the near misses caused splinter damage and casualties to the crew. Nowaki was able to escape due to the range and her speed. The action against Nowaki was part of Operation Hailstone. This is the only surface engagement that Iowa-class battleships are known to have engaged in. In the action, Iowa sank the Japanese training cruiser Katori, while New Jersey helped to sink destroyer Maikaze, and the auxiliary cruiser Akagi Maru. This surface action was controversial since US Navy carrier aircraft were available and could have achieved similar results.

== 1960s ==
The gun was also used as the basis for Project HARP, an experimental gun-based space-launch research program.

== See also ==
- List of naval guns
- List of World War II artillery
- 46 cm/45 Type 94 naval gun
- Armament of the Iowa class battleship
- List of the largest cannon by caliber
- 16-inch/45-caliber Mark 6 gun
- Project HARP

=== Weapons of comparable role, performance and era ===
- 40.6 cm SK C/34 gun German equivalent
