= Armament of the Iowa-class battleship =

Armament of WWII battleship

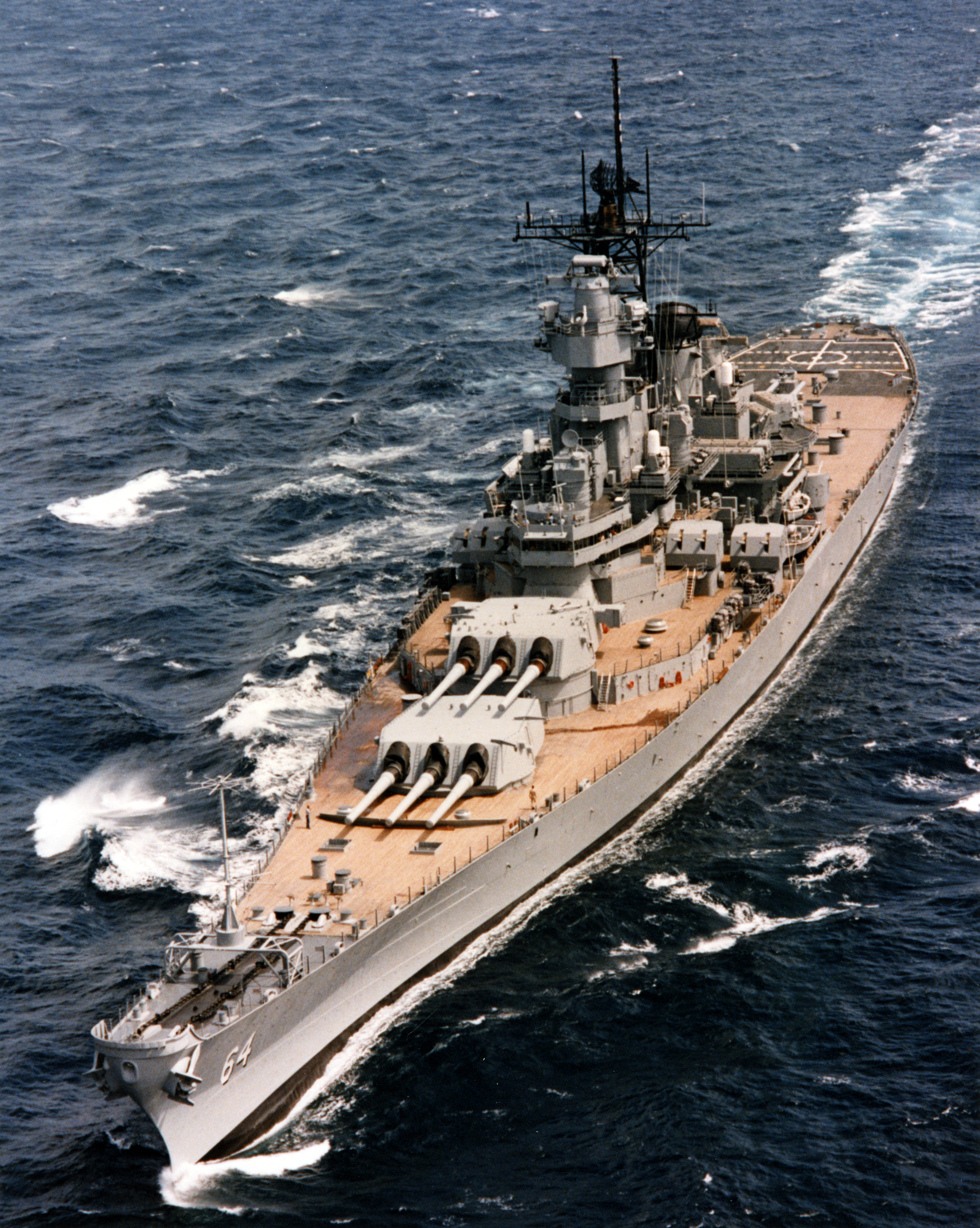
USS Wisconsin, photographed at sea in her 1980s configuration.

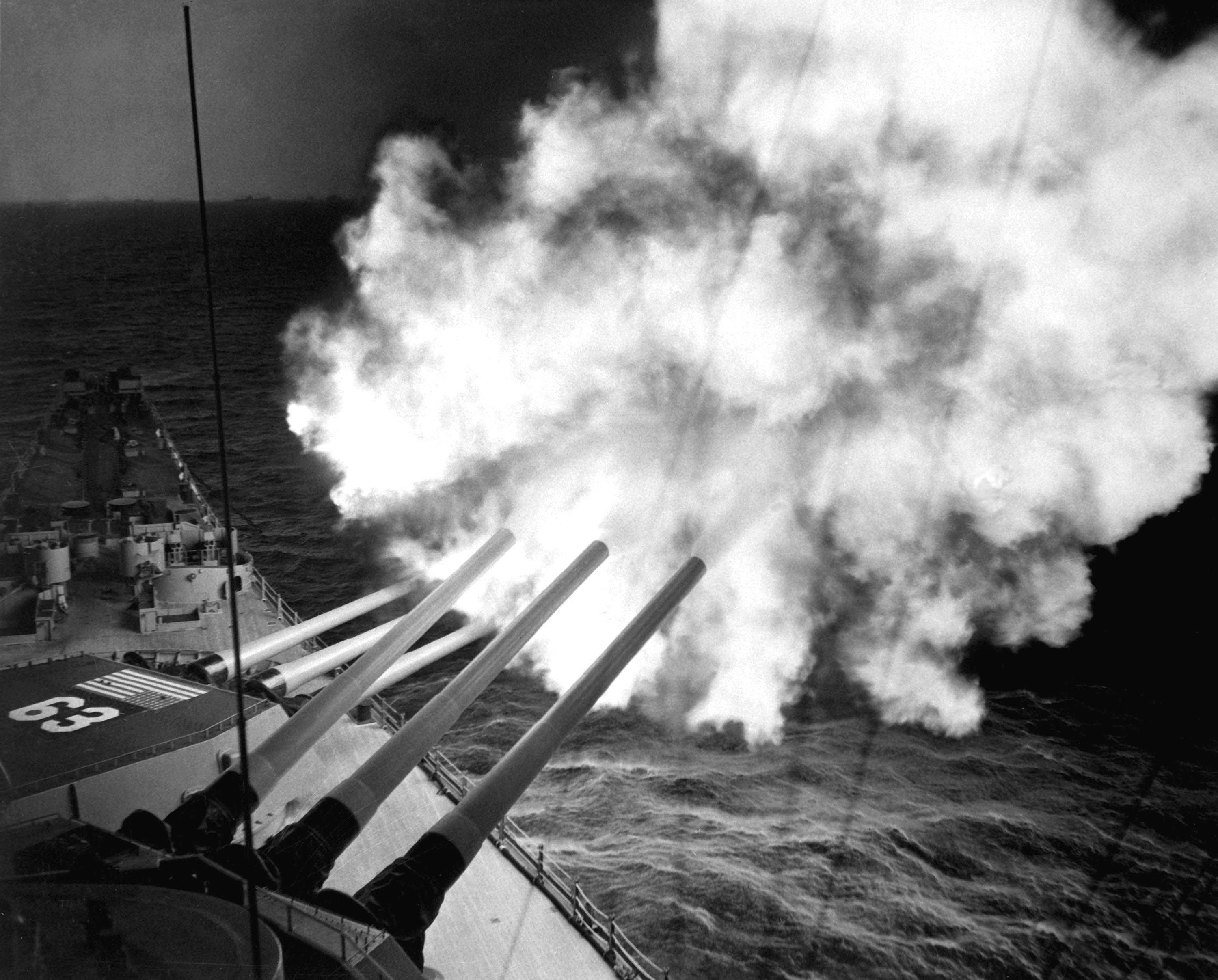
USS Missouri fires her 16-inch guns

The Iowa-class battleships are the most heavily armed warships the United States Navy has ever put to sea, due to the continual development of their onboard weaponry. The first Iowa-class ship was laid down in June 1940; in their World War II configuration, each of the Iowa-class battleships had a main battery of 16-inch (406 mm) guns that could hit targets nearly 20 statute miles (32 km) away with a variety of artillery shells designed for anti-ship or bombardment work. The secondary battery of 5-inch (127 mm) guns could hit targets nearly 9 statute miles (14 km) away with solid projectiles or proximity fuzed shells, and was effective in an anti-aircraft role as well. Each of the four battleships carried a wide array of 20 mm and 40 mm anti-aircraft guns for defense against enemy aircraft.

When reactivated and modernized in the 1980s, each battleship retained the original battery of nine 16-inch (406 mm) guns, but the secondary battery on each battleship was reduced from ten twin-gun mounts and twenty guns to six twin-gun mounts with 12 guns to allow for the installation of two platforms for the Tomahawk missiles. Each battleship also received four Harpoon missile magazines, Phalanx anti-aircraft/anti-missile systems, and electronic warfare suites.

== Main battery ==
=== Turrets ===
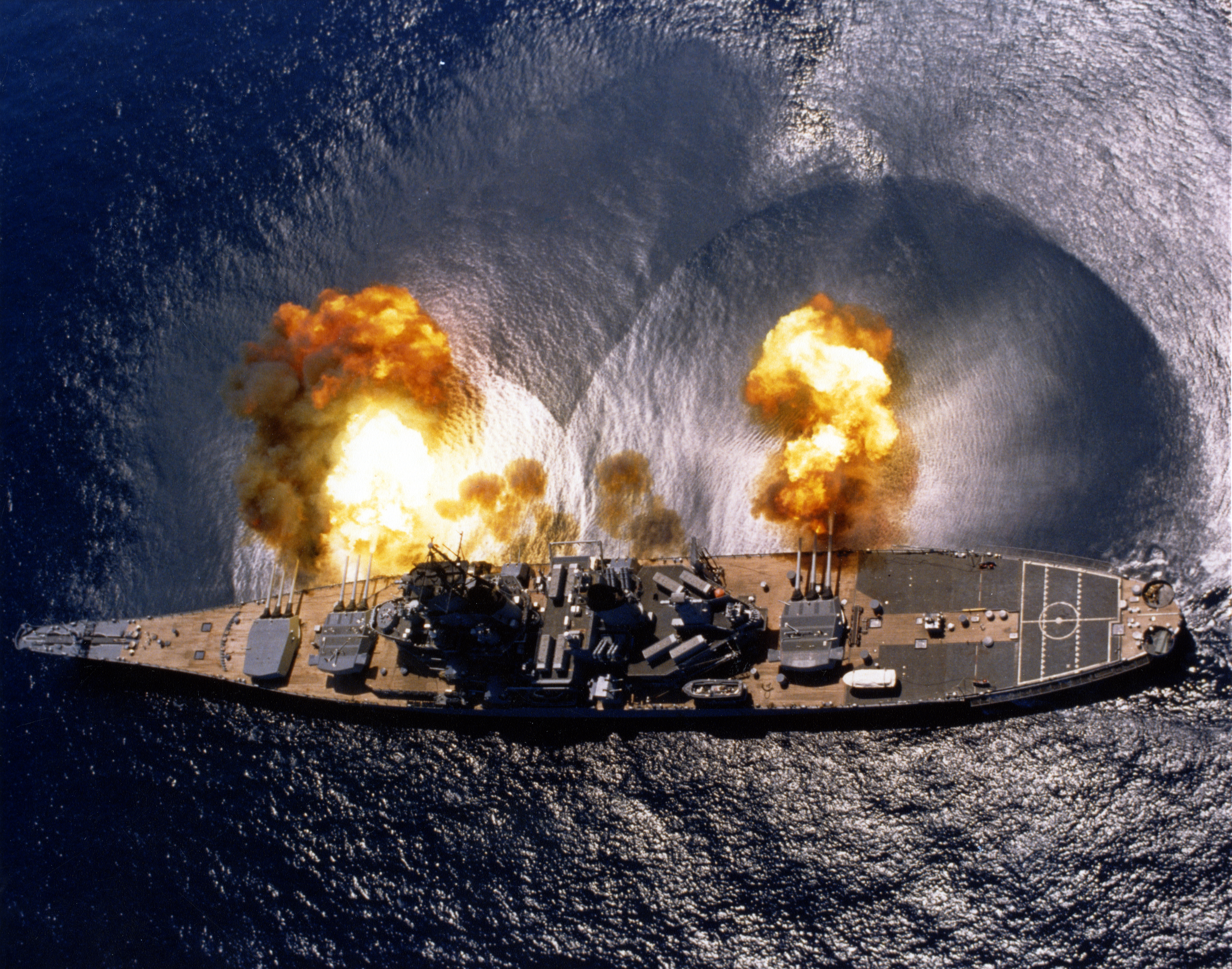
USS Iowa fires a full broadside of nine 16 inch (406 mm)/50-caliber and six 5-inch (127 mm)/38-caliber guns during a target exercise. There are concussion effects on the water surface, and the 16-inch (406 mm) gun barrels are in varying degrees of recoil.

The primary armament of an Iowa-class battleship consisted of nine breech-loading 16 inch (406 mm)/50-caliber Mark 7 naval guns, which were housed in three 3-gun turrets: two forward and one aft in a configuration known as "2-A-1". The guns were 66 feet (20 m) long - 50 times their 16-inch(406mm) bore, or 50 calibers, from breechface to muzzle. About 43 feet (13 m) protruded from the gun house. Each gun weighed about 239,000 pounds (108,000 kg) without the breech, or 267,900 pounds (121,500 kg) with the breech. They fired 2,700 pounds (1,225 kg) armor-piercing projectiles at a muzzle velocity of 2,500 ft/s (762 m/s), or 1,900 pounds (862 kg) high-capacity projectiles at 2,690 ft/s (820 m/s), up to 24 miles (21 nmi; 39 km).

Each gun rested within an armored turret, but only the top of the turret protruded above the main deck. The turret extended either four decks (Turrets 1 and 3) or five decks (Turret 2) down. The lower spaces contained the equipment required to rotate the turret and to elevate the guns attached to each turret. At the bottom of the turret were rooms which were used for handling the projectiles and storing the powder bags used to fire them. All of the compartments within the turrets were separated by flameproof bulkheads to prevent any flame or lethal gas from spreading throughout the turret. Each turret required a crew of 77–94 men to operate.

Although frequently referred to as "triple gun" turrets, they were, in fact, classified as "three gun" turrets, due to the ability to elevate and fire each gun in the turret independently. This is as opposed to true "triple gun" turrets, in which all three guns must be operated as one. The ships could fire any combination of their guns, including a broadside of all nine.

The guns could be elevated from −5° to +45°, moving at up to 12° per second. The turrets could be rotated about 300° at a rate of about four degrees per second and could even be fired back beyond the beam, which is sometimes called "over the shoulder." The guns were never fired horizontally forward (in the 1980s refit, a satellite up-link antenna was mounted at the bow). To distinguish between the rounds fired from different battleships the Iowa class used dye bags which allowed artillery observers to determine which rounds had been fired by which ship. Iowa, New Jersey, Missouri, and Wisconsin were assigned the colors orange, blue, red and green, respectively.

Cut away of a 16-inch (406 mm) gun turret

When brought into service during World War II the guns had a barrel life of roughly 290 rounds, limited in large part by the nitrated cellulose (NC) propellant. After World War II the Navy switched to smokeless powder diphenylamine (SPD), a cooler-burning propellant, which increased the barrel life from 290 to about 350 rounds. This was increased further by the introduction of a titanium dioxide and wax compound known as "Swedish Additive" on New Jersey for her tour in Vietnam, and later used on all four Iowas when they were reactivated in the 1980s. These measures were further augmented by the addition of polyurethane jackets, which were placed over the powder bags to reduce gaseous erosion during the firing of the guns. These measures greatly prolonged barrel life, and ultimately resulted in a shift from measuring barrel life in equivalent service rounds (ESR) to measuring barrel life in fatigue equivalent rounds (FER).

After the guns were fired, each barrel had to be cleaned; the gunners mates assigned the job of cleaning them required a full day or more to ensure that the barrels were correctly and adequately cleaned.

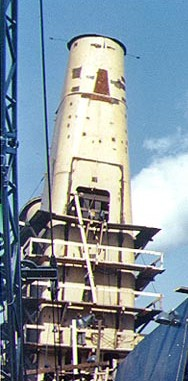
USS Iowa's Fire Control Tower under construction in 1942

=== Fire control ===
The early main battery fire control consisted of the Fire Control Tower, two Mark 38 Gun Fire Control Systems (GFCS), and fire control equipment located in two of the three turrets. As modernized in the 1980s, each turret carried a DR-810 radar that measured the muzzle velocity of each gun, which made it easier to predict the velocity of succeeding shots. Together with the Mark 160 FCS and better propellant consistency, the improvements created the most accurate battleship-caliber guns ever made.

==== Mark 38 gun fire control system ====
The major components of the Mk 38 Gun Fire Control System (GFCS) were the Director, Plotting Room, and interconnecting data transmission equipment. Two systems, forward and aft, were each complete and independent, though they could be cross-connected. Their plotting rooms were isolated to protect against battle damage propagating from one to the other.

===== Director =====
Mark 38 Director

The forward Mk 38 Director (pictured) was situated on top of the fire control tower. The director was equipped with Mark 45 Rangefinder optical sights (the long thin boxes protruding from each side), and a Mark 13 Fire Control Radar antenna (the rectangular shaped box on top). The purpose of the Director was to track the target's present bearing and range. This could be done electronically with the radar (the preferred method), or optically by the men inside using the sights and Rangefinder. The present position of the target was called the Line-Of-Sight (LOS), and it was continuously sent down to the Mk 8 Rangekeeper in the plotting room by Synchro transmitters. When not using the radar's display to determine Spots, the director was the optical spotting station.

===== Plotting room =====
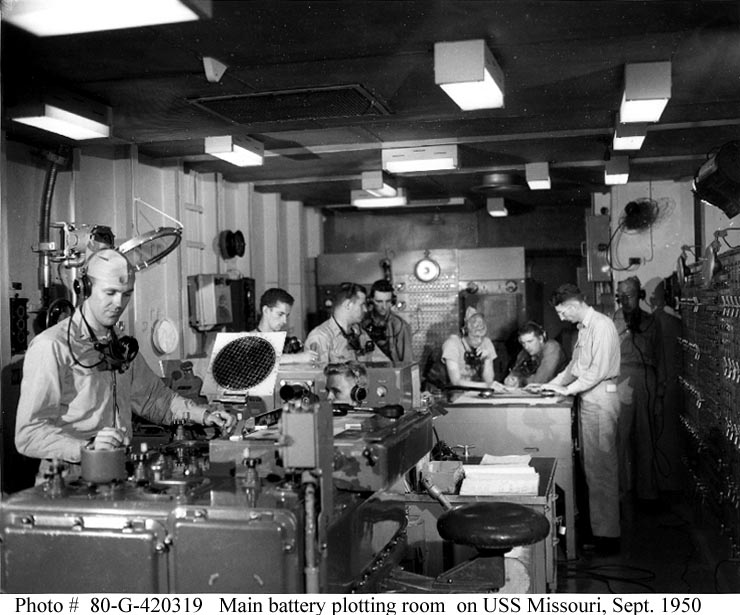
USS Missouri's Main Plot, c1950

The forward main battery plotting room was located below the waterline and inside the armored belt. It housed the forward system's Mark 8 Rangekeeper, Mark 41 Stable Vertical, Mk13 FC Radar controls and displays, Parallax Correctors, Fire Control Switchboard, battle telephone switchboard, battery status indicators, assistant Gunnery Officers, and Fire Control Technicians (FTs).

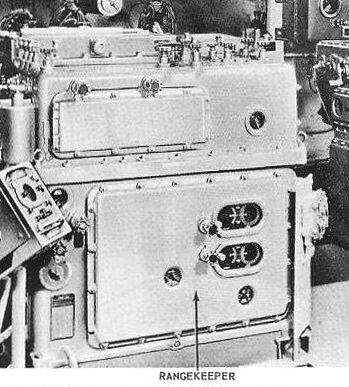
Mark 8 Rangekeeper

The Mk 8 Rangekeeper was an electromechanical analog computer whose function was to continuously calculate the gun's bearing and elevation, Line-Of-Fire (LOF), to hit a future position of the target. It did this by automatically receiving information from the director (LOS), the FC Radar (range), the ship's gyrocompass (true ship's course), the ship's Pitometer log (ship's speed), the Stable Vertical (ship's roll and pitch), and the ship's anemometer (relative wind speed and direction). Also, before the surface action started, the FTs made manual inputs for the average initial velocity of the projectiles fired out of the battery's gun barrels, and air density. With all this information, the Rangekeeper calculated the relative motion between "OWN SHIP" and "TARGET". It then could calculate an offset angle and change of range between the target's present position (LOS) and future position at the end of the projectile's time of flight. To this bearing and range offset, it added corrections for gravity, wind, Magnus effect of the spinning projectile, earth's curvature, and coriolis effect. The result was the turret's bearing and elevation orders (LOF). During the surface action, range and deflection Spots and target altitude (not zero during Gun Fire Support) were manually entered.

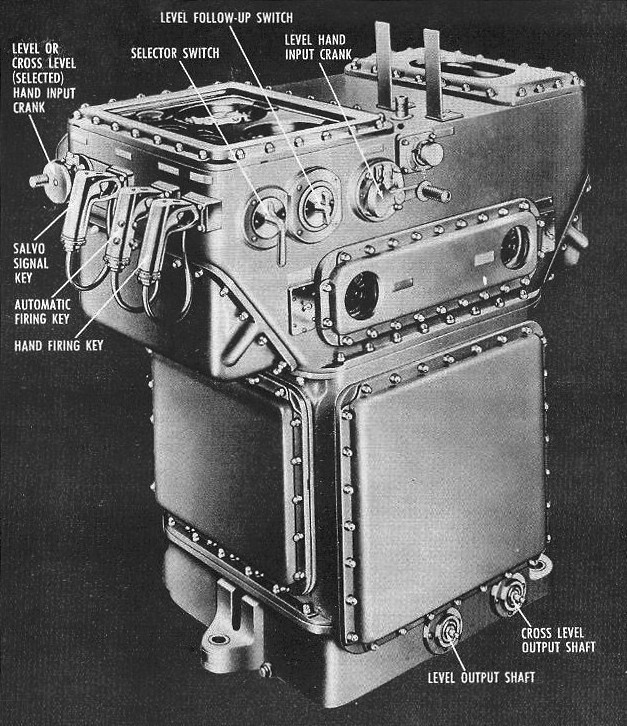
Mark 41 Stable Vertical

The Mk 41 Stable Vertical (also called Gun Director) was a vertical seeking gyroscope. Its function was to establish and maintain a stable earth vertical with its associated horizontal plane. With the horizontal plane established, the Mk 41 continuously measured the angles between the deck and the horizontal plane. These deck angles were continuously transmitted to the Rangekeeper so that it could keep the guns correctly elevated as the ship rolled and pitched. Mounted waist high on its side were the battery's firing keys. (see picture) The left key was the Salvo Signal Key, and it sounded the Salvo Buzzer in each of the turrets to warn the gun crews that the guns were about to fire. The center key (with bumps on its handle for tactile identification) was the Automatic Firing Key. When this key was held closed, the Mk 41 was enabled to automatically fire the guns whenever the ship's deck was parallel the horizontal plane. Also, if the sea state was such that the turrets' elevation power drives could not keep up with the ship's motion, the guns could be held at a fixed elevation, and the MK 41 could again automatically fire the guns as described. The right key was the Hand Firing Key. It bypassed the Mk 41, and fired the guns directly.

The Mk 13 FC Radar supplied present target range, and it showed the fall of shot around the target so the Gunnery Officer could correct the system's aim with range and deflection spots put into the Rangekeeper. It could also automatically track the target by controlling the director's bearing power drive. Because of radar, Fire Control systems were theoretically to track and fire at targets at a greater range and with increased accuracy during the day, night, or inclement weather. This capability gave the United States Navy a major advantage in World War II, as the Japanese did not develop radar or automated fire control to the level of the US Navy and were at a significant disadvantage.

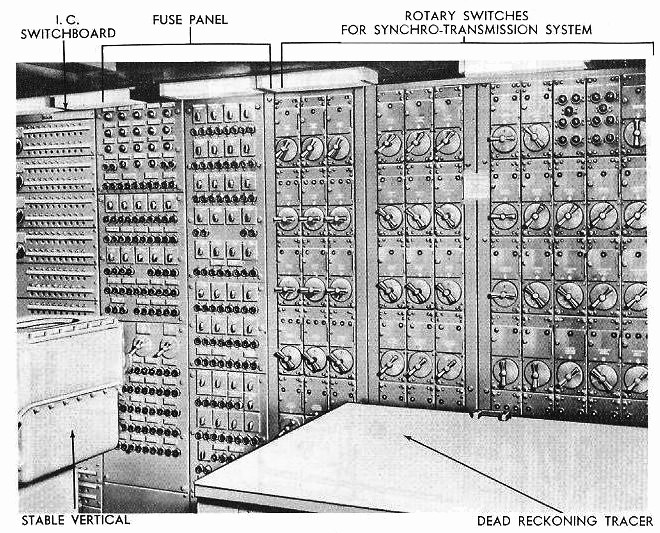
Fire Control Switchboard

The Parallax Correctors were needed because the turrets were located hundreds of feet from the director. There was one for each turret, and each had the turret/director distance manually set in. They automatically received Relative Target Bearing (bearing from own ship's bow), and Target Range. They corrected the bearing order for each turret so that all rounds fired in a salvo converged on the same point.

The Fire Control Switchboard configured the battery. With it, the Gunnery Officer could mix and match the three turrets to the two GFCSs. He could have the turrets all controlled by the forward system, all controlled by the aft system, or split the battery to shoot at two targets.

The assistant Gunnery Officers and Fire Control Technicians operated the equipment, talked to the turrets and ship's command by sound-powered telephone, and watched the Rangekeeper's dials and system status indicators for problems. If a problem arose, they could correct the problem, or reconfigure the system to mitigate its effect.

==== Turret fire control systems ====
Turrets 2 and 3 had optical rangefinders and ballistics computers. (The rangefinders are the boxes on the turret's rear corners). If in a surface action the GFCSs were damaged, the Turret Officer could turn the Auto-Local rotary switch to Local and continue the action using the turret's fire control equipment.

=== Ammunition ===
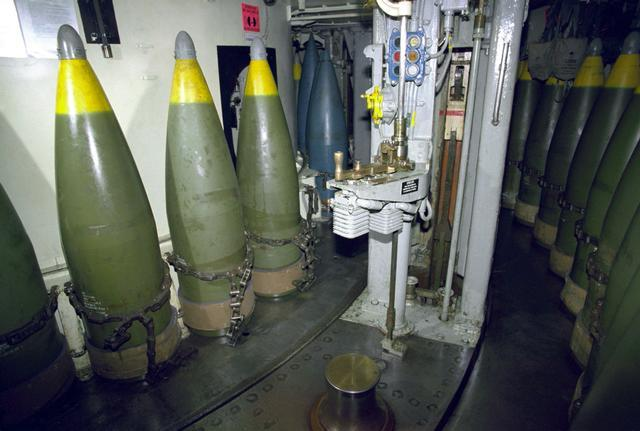
16-inch naval gunfire shells

The large caliber guns were designed to fire two different 16-inch shells: an armor-piercing round for anti-ship and anti-structure work and a high explosive round designed for use against unarmored targets and shore bombardment. A third type of ammunition for delivering tactical nuclear warheads was developed subsequently.

The Mk. 8 APC (Armor-Piercing, Capped) shell weighed 2,700 lb (1225 kg) and was designed to penetrate the hardened steel armor carried by foreign battleships. At 20,000 yards (18 km) the Mk. 8 could penetrate 20 inches (508 mm) of steel armor plate. At the same range, the Mk. 8 could penetrate 21 feet (6.4 m) of reinforced concrete.

For unarmored targets and shore bombardment, the 1,900 lb (862 kg) Mk. 13 HC (High-Capacity – referring to the large bursting charge) shell was available. The Mk. 13 shell would create a crater 50 feet (15 m) wide and 20 feet (6 m) deep upon impact and detonation, and could defoliate trees 400 yards (360 m) from the point of impact. Mk. 13 High Capacity shells that were made by manufacturers other than the Naval Gun Factory received the designation Mk. 14 HC, but were otherwise identical.

The final type of ammunition developed for the Iowa class were "Katie" shells. These shells were born from the concept of nuclear deterrence that had begun to shape the United States armed forces as the Cold War began. To compete with the Air Force and the Army, which had developed nuclear bombs and nuclear shells for use on the battlefield, the US Navy began a top-secret program to develop Mk. 23 nuclear naval shells with an estimated yield of 15 to 20 kilotons. These shells were designed to be launched from the best seaborne artillery platform available, which at the time were the four ships of the Iowa class. The shells entered development around 1953, and were reportedly ready by 1956; it is not known whether they were ever deployed on the Iowa-class battleships because the US Navy does not confirm or deny the presence of nuclear weapons aboard its ships. In 1991 the US unilaterally withdrew its nuclear artillery shells from service, and Russia responded in kind in 1992. The US removed around 1,300 nuclear shells from Europe and reportedly dismantled its last shells by 2003.

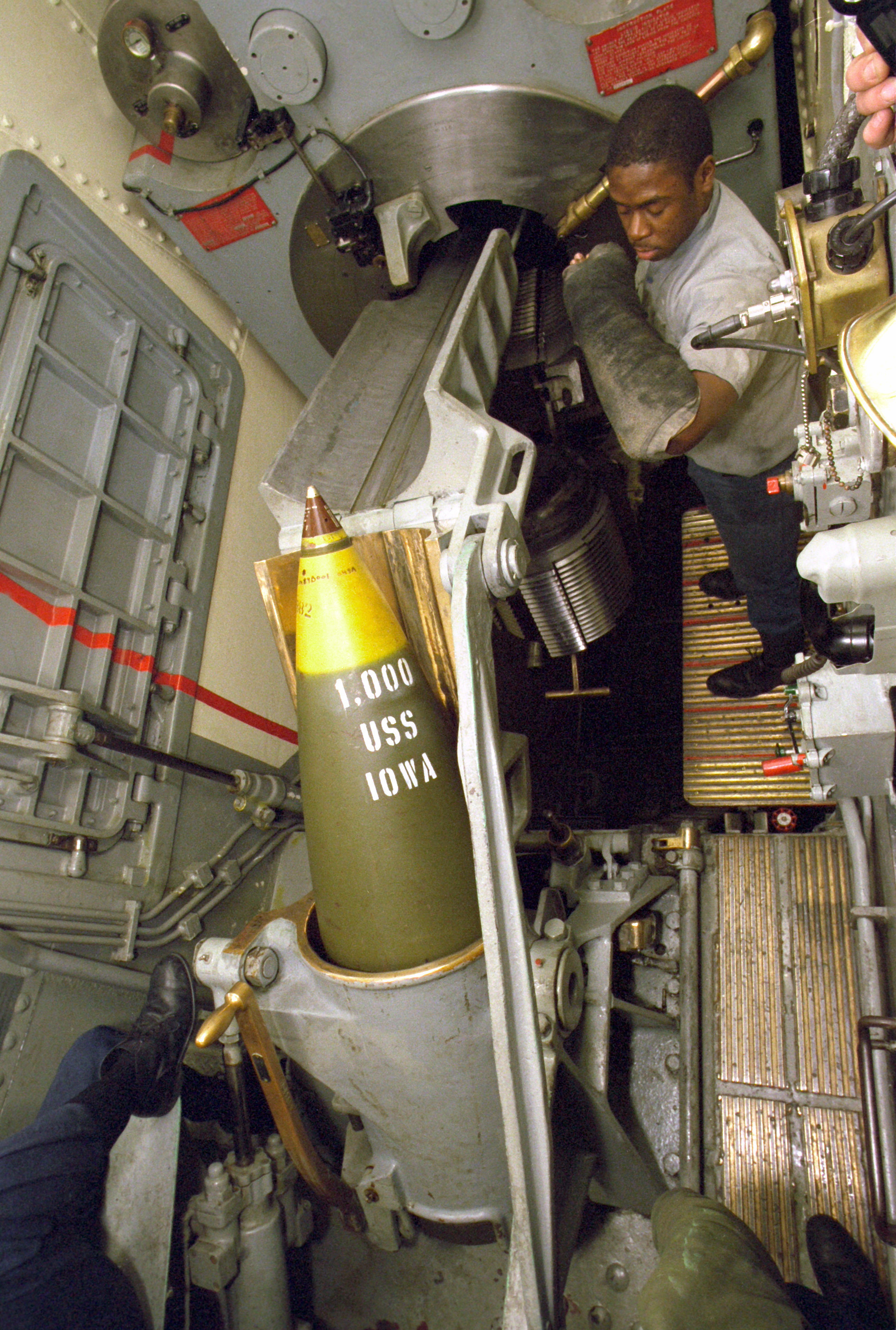
Loading shell, 1986.

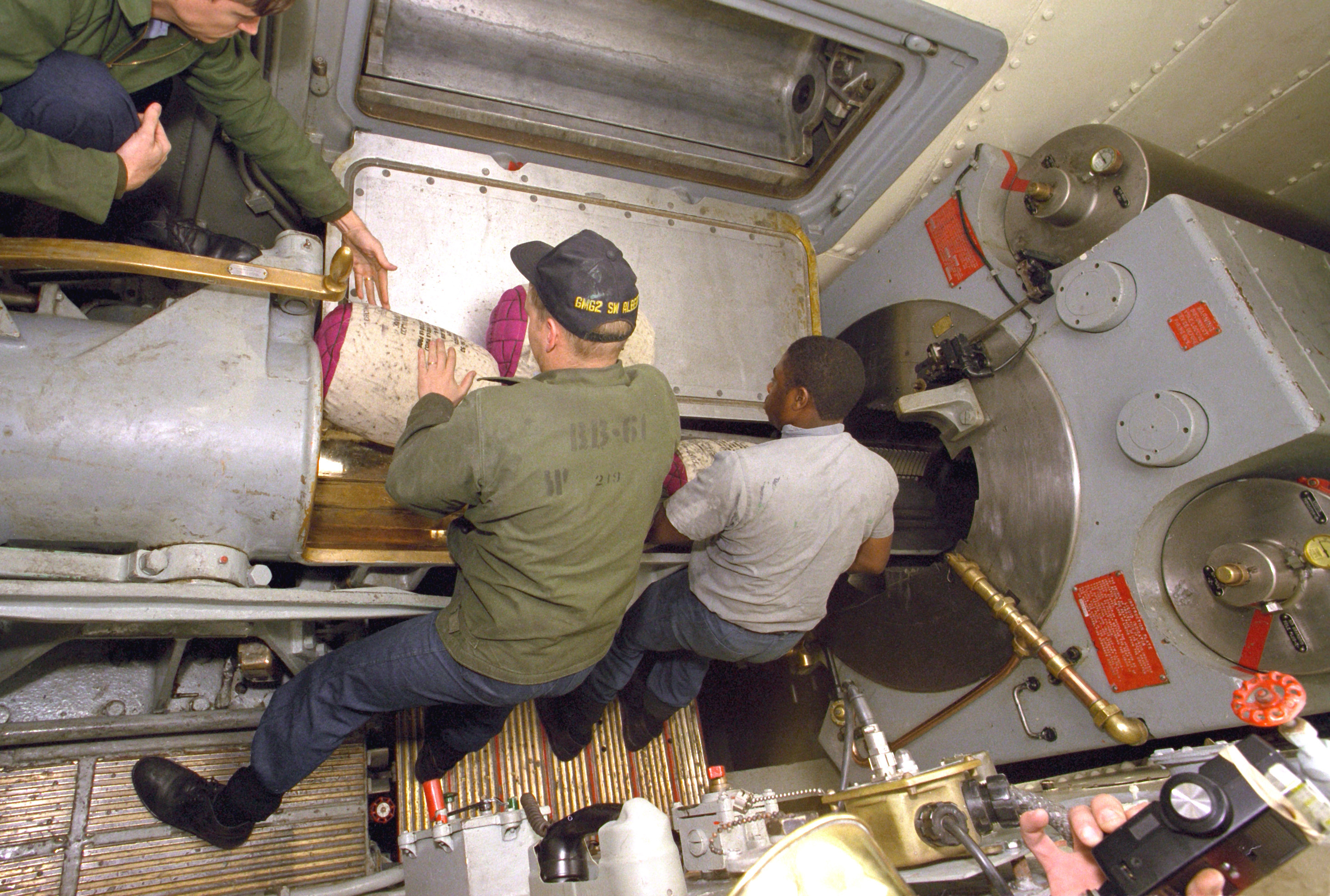
Placing powder bags, 1986.

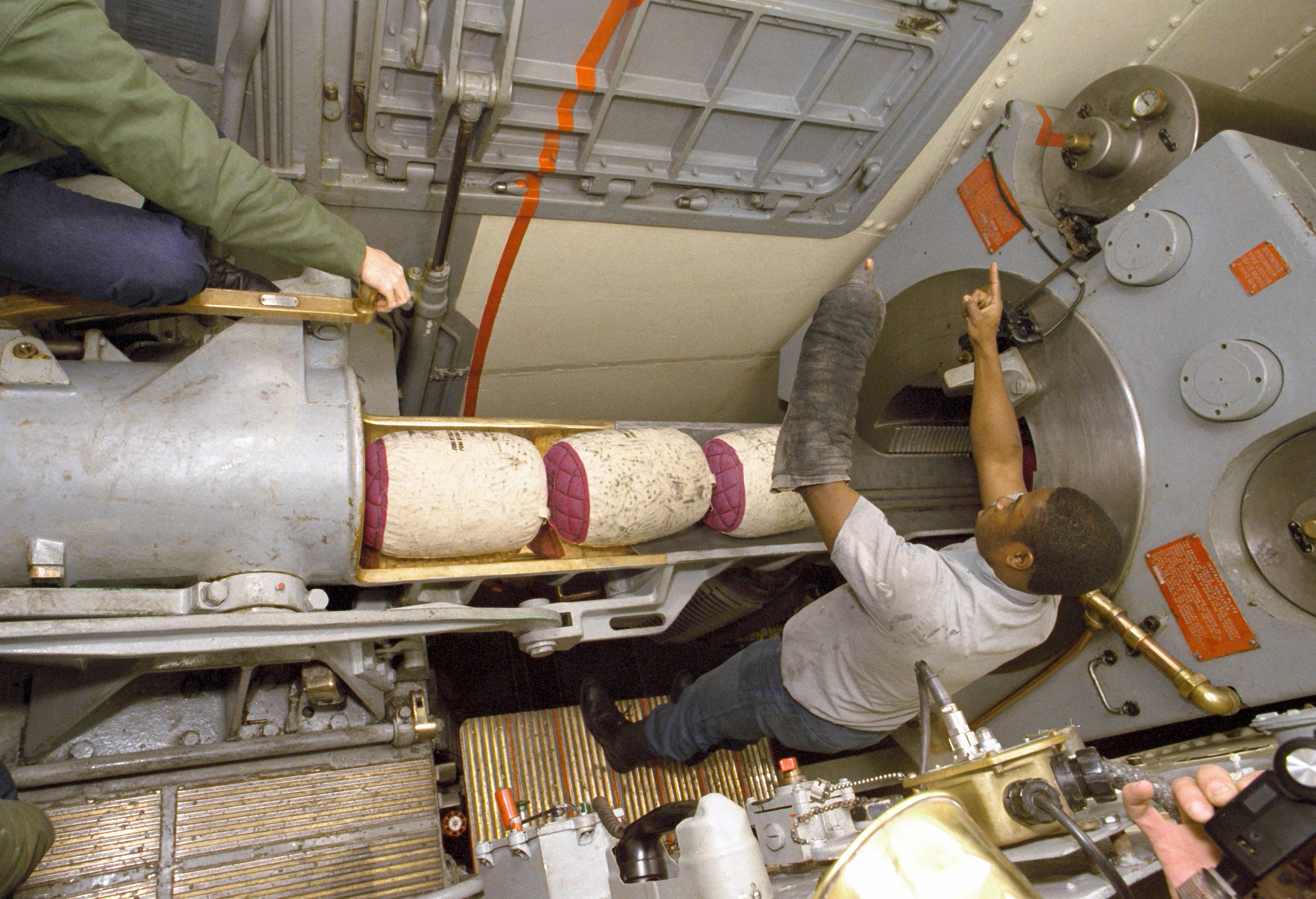
Ramming powder bags, 1986.

== Secondary battery ==
The secondary battery was a dual-purpose weapon system, meaning that it was designed to defend the ship from either surface or aerial threats. The original secondary battery consisted of 10 Mark 28, Mod 2 twin gun mounts, and four Mark 37 Gun Fire Control Systems. At first, this battery's effectiveness against aircraft diminished as planes became faster, but this changed toward the end of World War II through a combination of an upgrade to the Mk37 System and the development of the VT (Variable Time) proximity fuze.

In preparation for the reactivations in the 1960s and 1980s, the battery was updated to the latest gun and fire control system modifications. In the 1968 upgrade to USS New Jersey for service off Vietnam, three Mark 56 Gun Fire Control Systems were installed, two on either side just forward of the aft stack, and one between the aft mast and the aft Mk 38 Director tower. This increased New Jersey's anti-aircraft capability, because the Mk 56 system could track and shoot at faster planes. In the 1980s modernization, the Mk 56 GFCSs and four mounts were removed to make room for missiles, leaving the Secondary battery with four Mk 37 GFCSs and six twin mounts on all the Iowa class. By the time of the Gulf War the secondary battery was largely relegated to shore bombardment and littoral defense. Since each battleship carried a small detachment of Marines aboard, the Marines would man one of the 5-inch gun mounts.

=== Mark 28, Mod 2 mounts ===
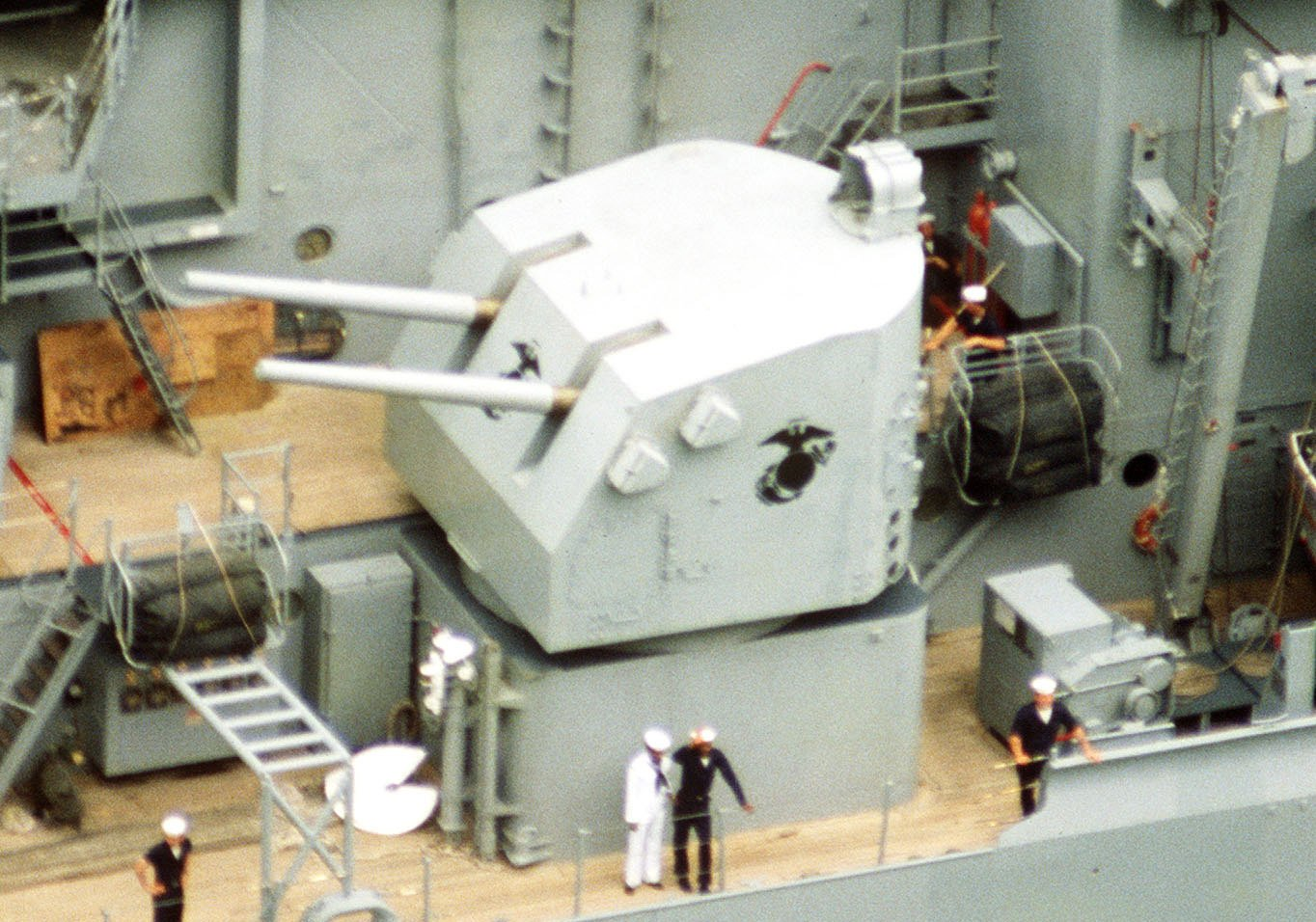
A 5-inch (127 mm) gun mount emblazoned with the Eagle, Globe, and Anchor of the United States Marine Corps aboard the battleship New Jersey

Each Mk 28 Mod 2 Mount carried two Mark 12, 5in/38cal gun assemblies, electric-hydraulic drives for bearing and elevation, optical sights, automatic fuze setter, automatic sight setter, and an upper handling room. Each armored twin mount weighed 170,635 lb (77,399 kg). The mount had a crew of 13, not including the ammunition movers in the upper handling room and magazines, drawn from the sailors and Marines serving aboard the ship.

==== Mark 12 gun assembly ====
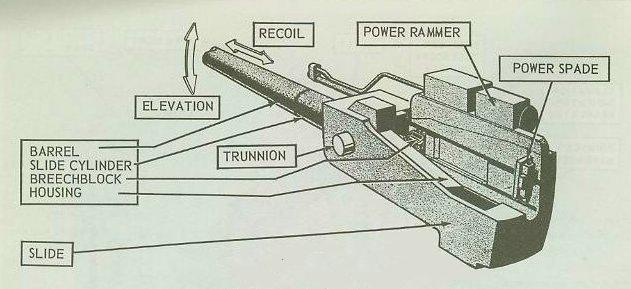
Mk 12 Gun Assembly (right gun)

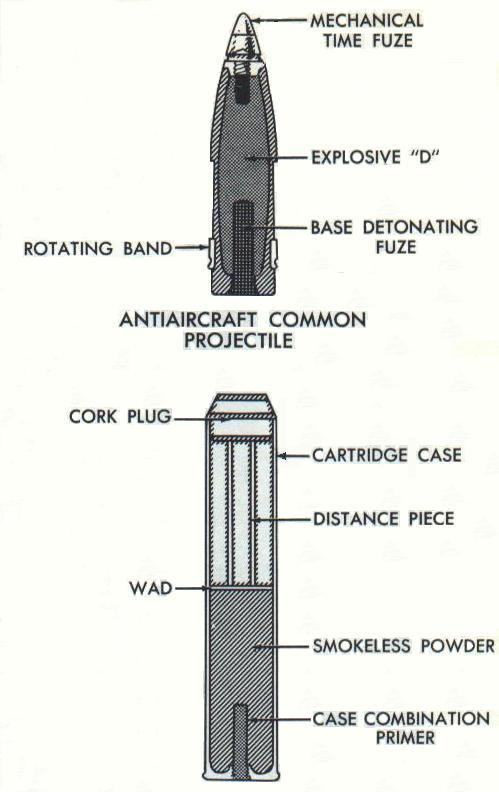
5in/38cal semi-fixed ammunition. Anti-aircraft Common (AAC) Projectile with Full Service Charge.

The Mk 12 Gun Assembly (pictured) was a semi-automatic, power rammed, vertical sliding-wedge breech block type gun. The Gun Assembly shown in the picture is the mount's right gun. The left gun is the mirror image of the right gun. Since this gun assembly fired semi-fixed ammunition, (pictured) each round was delivered to the guns in two pieces. Each gun, in this twin mount, had its own projectile hoist and powder case hoist from the upper handling room. The electric-hydraulic projectile hoist would deliver a projectile next to the projectile man with the nose down and waist high. The electric-hydraulic powder case hoist poked the case through a powder scuttle in the gun room's deck just next to the powder man's feet. At the load command, the powder man would slip a primer protector off the end of the powder case, extract the case from the scuttle, and lift it into the gun's rammer tray.

Meanwhile, the projectile man would pull a projectile out of the hoist, and place it in the rammer tray in front of the powder case. Then, as he turned to get the next projectile out of the hoist, the projectile man would pull down on the rammer lever. This caused the power rammer to ram the projectile and powder case into the chamber. As the powder case cleared the top of the breechblock, the block would rise to seal the chamber. The gun was ready to fire. The case combination primer in the base of the powder case could be fired either electrically or by percussion. Electrical firing was the preferred method because the firing circuit could be energized by firing keys down in the plotting room when firing salvos at surface targets, or up in the director when firing at air targets. Percussion firing could be executed by the Pointer (man controlling elevation) by pushing a foot treadle. When the gun fired, the recoil's rearward motion returned the rammer lever to the up position, and the rammer would drive back to the rear of the rammer tray. During counter-recoil, the breechblock was automatically lowered and the spent powder case was ejected from the chamber. When the gun returned to battery, a blast of compressed air was sent down the bore to clean it out. The gun was ready to be reloaded.

==== Electric-hydraulic drives ====
The electric-hydraulic drives powered the mount's motion. The three modes of drive operation were automatic, local, and manual. In automatic, the drives would follow the bearing and elevation orders of the fire control system. In local, the drives would follow the motion of the trainer's and pointer's hand wheels. (This is similar to power steering on a car.) Manual was direct gear linkage from the hand wheels to move the mount with no power assist.

==== Sights ====
The periscopic sights (the boxes on the side of the mount) allowed the trainer and pointer to see the target from inside the armored enclosure. Each sight had movable prisms that allowed its line of sight to be moved relative to the barrel's bore axis. These prisms could be controlled by the fire control system when the mount was in Automatic, or by the mount's sight setter operator when the mount was in Local. Local control was not the preferred combat method, but it could be used if the fire control systems were damaged. The mount captain was trained in aiming and correcting the fall of shot.

==== Upper handling room ====
The upper handling room was just below the visible part of the mount. It was armored and reinforced to support the weight of the mount. A person standing in the upper handling room could look up and see the bottom of the gun mount inside the training circle on which the mount rotated. Hanging from the mount, and rotating with it, was the equipment used to pass ammunition up to the mount. This included the lower ends of the projectile and powder case hoists. In the center of the room there was a vertical tube that also turned with the mount. This tube enclosed the electrical power and control cables going up to the mount. Around the perimeter of the upper handling room were the ready service ammunition racks welded to the bulkheads. Close by, either in a corner of the handling room or in an adjoining compartment was the upper end of an ammunition hoist from the magazine. The responsibility of the men stationed in the upper handling room was to shuttle 30 to 40 projectiles and 30 to 40 powder cases per minute from the ready service racks to the hoists while avoiding the equipment rotating with the mount. During quiet spells, they would replenish the ready service racks with ammunition from the magazines.

=== Mark 37 gun fire control system ===
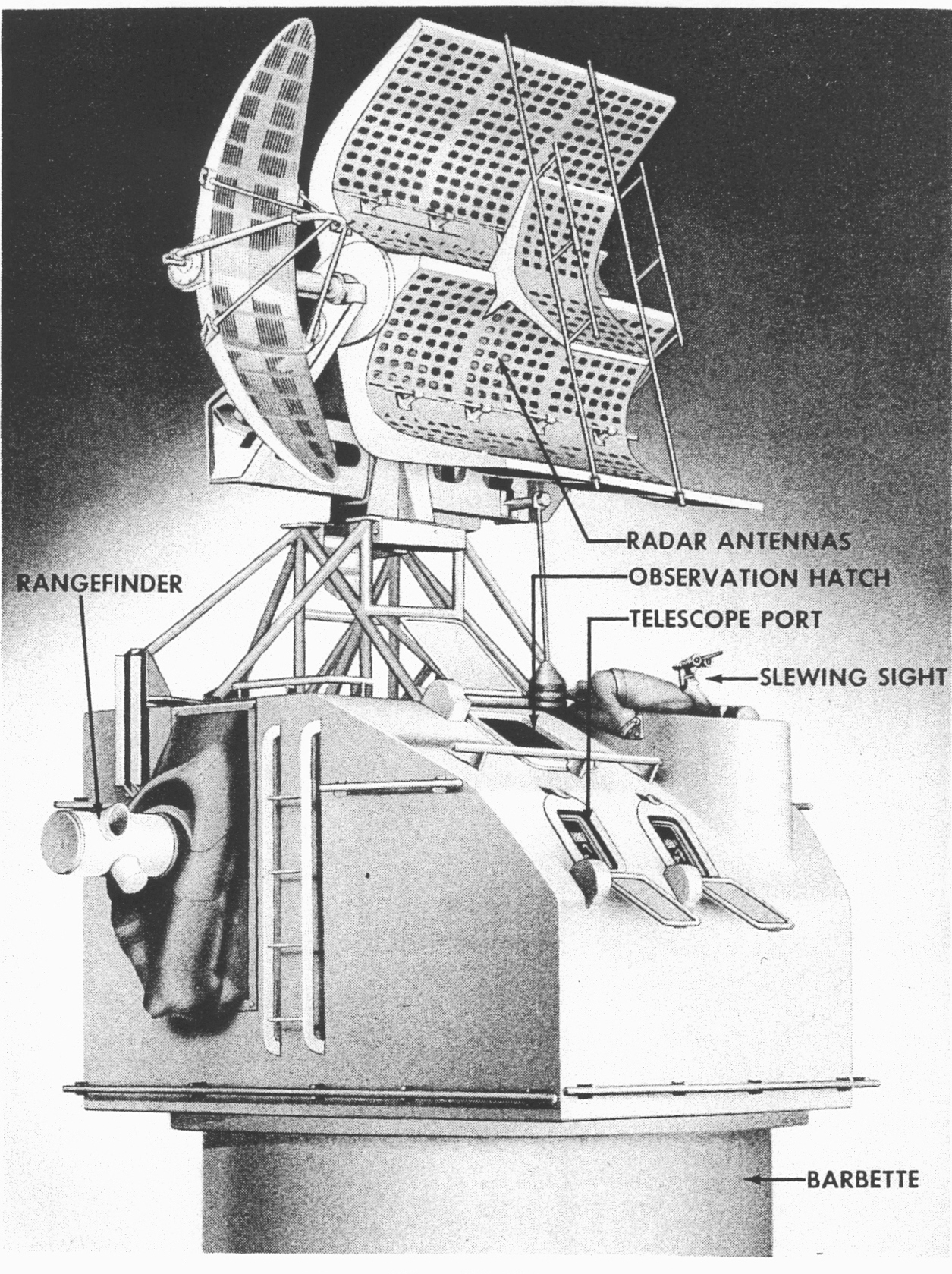
Mk 37 Director c. 1944

The Mark 37 Gun Fire Control System (GFCS) was the primary Fire Control System for the Secondary Battery. There were four Mk37 GFCSs on board; one forward above the navigation bridge, two amidships on either side of the forward stack, and one aft between the aft Mk38 Director and Turret three. The major components of the Mk 37 GFCS were the Mk 37 Director, and the equipment in the plotting room.

==== Mark 37 director ====
The function of the Mark 37 director (pictured) was to track the present position of the target in bearing, elevation, and range. To do this, it had optical sights (the rectangular windows on the front), an optical rangefinder (the tubes sticking out each side), and Fire Control Radar antennas. On the MK 37 Director pictured, the rectangular antenna is for the Mark 12 FC radar, and the parabolic antenna on the left is for the Mk 22 FC radar. They were part of an upgrade to improve tracking of aircraft. The Director Officer also had a Slew Sight that he could use to quickly point the director towards a new target.

==== Plotting room ====
The secondary battery plotting rooms were down below the waterline and inside the armor belt. They contained four complete sets of fire control equipment needed to aim and shoot at four targets. Each set included a Mark 1A computer, a Mark 6 Stable Element, fire-control radar controls and displays, Parallax correctors, a switchboard, and crew to operate it all.

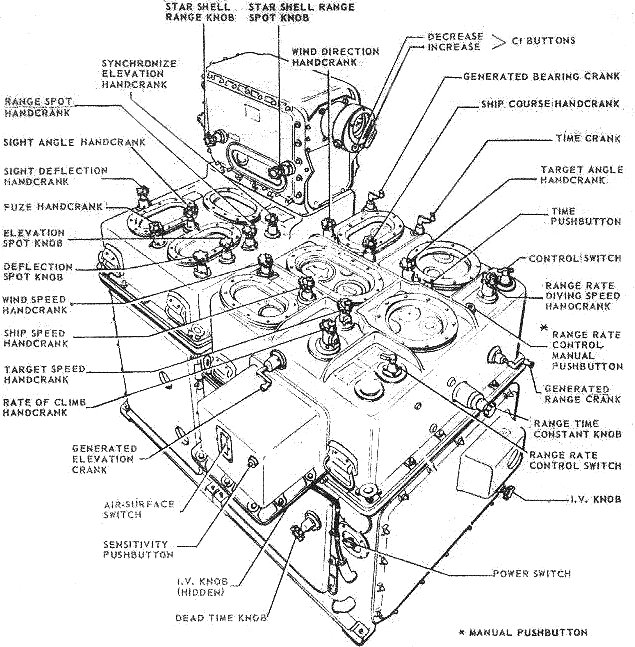
Mark 1A Computer

The Mark 1A Fire Control Computer (pictured) was an electro-mechanical analog ballistic computer. Its function was to automatically aim the guns so that a fired projectile would collide with the target. This was the same function as the main battery's Mk 8 Rangekeeper above except that some of the targets the Mark 1A had to deal with also moved in elevation – and much faster. For a surface target, the Secondary Battery's Fire Control problem is the same as the Main Battery's with the same type inputs and outputs. The major difference between the two computers was their ballistics calculations. The amount of gun elevation needed to project a 5-inch (127 mm) shell 9 nmi (17 km) is different than the elevation needed to project a 16-inch shell the same distance. The ballistics calculations in these mechanical analog computers were performed by mechanisms like differential gears, levers, and small rods riding on the surface of three-dimensional cams. These mechanical adders, multipliers, and table lookup devices were handmade at the factory, and were buried deep in the workings of the computer. It was not possible to change a computer's ballistics at sea until the advent of fast digital computers. The anti-aircraft fire control problem was more complicated because it had the additional requirement of tracking the target in elevation and making target predictions in three dimensions. The outputs of the Mk 1A were the same (gun bearing and elevation), except fuze time was added. The fuze time was needed because the ideal of directly hitting the fast moving aircraft with the projectile was impractical. With fuze time set into the shell, it was hoped that it would explode near enough to the target to destroy it with the shock wave and shrapnel. Towards the end of World War II, the invention of the VT proximity fuze eliminated the need to use the fuze time calculation and its possible error. This greatly increased the odds of destroying an air target.

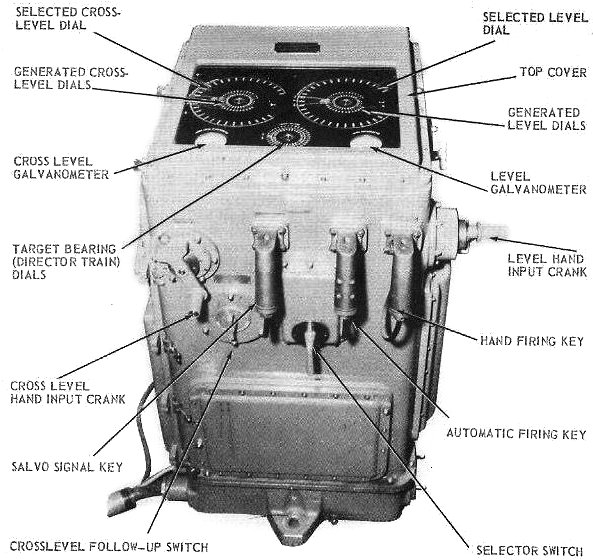
Mark 6 Stable Element

The function of the Mk 6 Stable Element (pictured) in this fire control system was the same as the function of the Mk 41 Stable Vertical in the main battery system above. It was a vertical seeking gyroscope that supplied the system with a stable up direction on a rolling and pitching ship. In surface mode, it replaced the director's elevation signal. It also had the surface mode firing keys.

The fire-control radar used on the Mk 37 GFCS has evolved. In the 1930s, the Mk 37 Director did not have a radar antenna. Then in September 1941, the rectangular Mk 4 fire-control radar antenna was mounted on top. Soon aircraft flew faster, and in c. 1944 to increase speed and accuracy the Mk 4 was replaced by a combination of the Mk 12 (rectangular antenna) and Mk 22 (parabolic antenna) radars. (pictured) Finally, the circular SPG 25 antenna was mounted on top as seen in the USS Wisconsin photo at the top of this article. (Look at the Mk 37 Director just above the bridge.)

== Anti-aircraft batteries ==
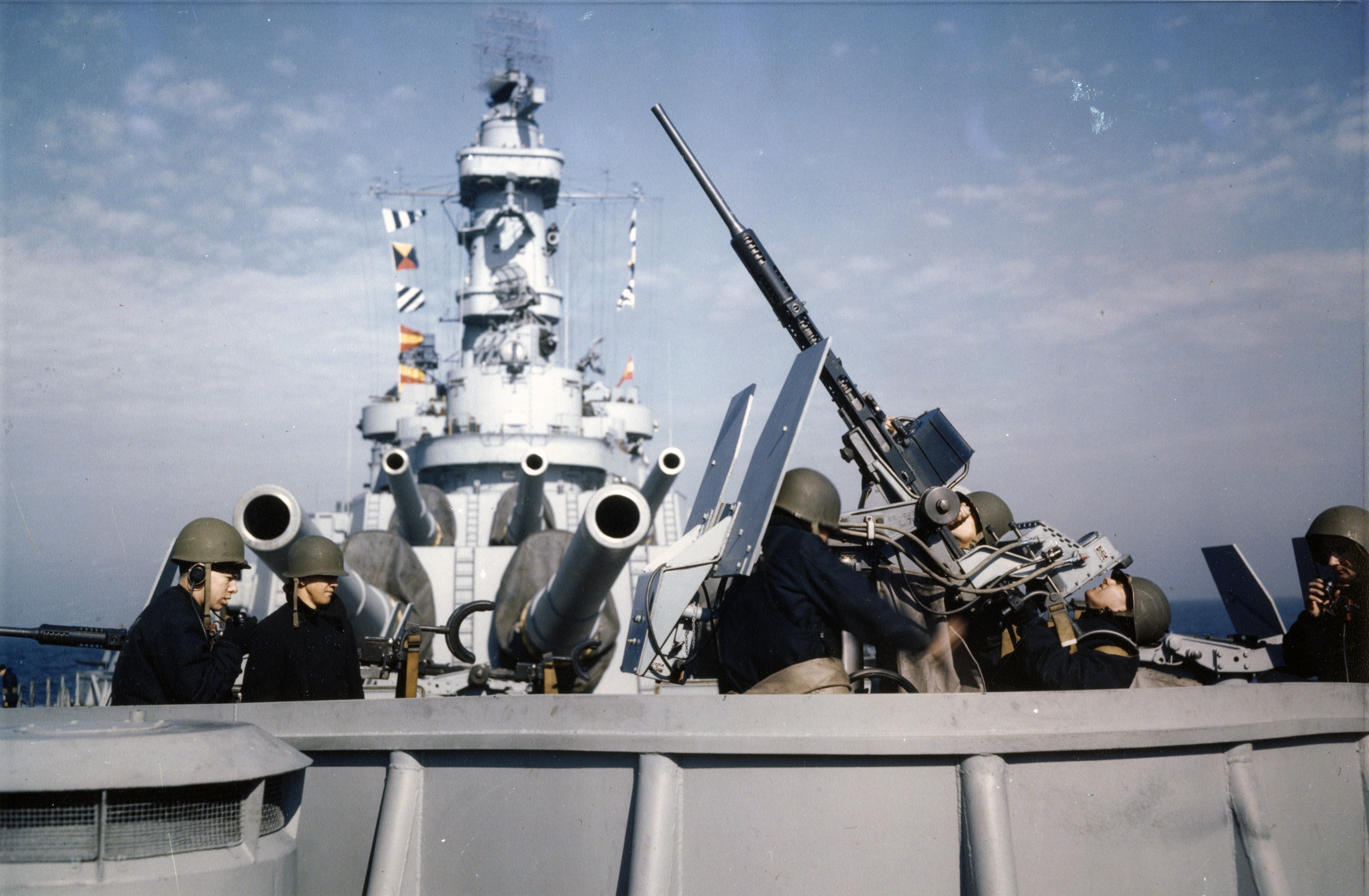
An Oerlikon 20 mm anti-aircraft gun aboard the battleship USS Iowa.

Since they were designed to escort the US fleet of fast attack aircraft carriers, the Iowa-class battleships were all intended to carry anti-aircraft guns to protect US aircraft carriers from Japanese fighters and dive bombers. This array included up to 20 quad 40 mm mounts and 49 single 20 mm mounts. In the 1968 USS New Jersey re-activation for service off Vietnam, the 20 mm and 40 mm batteries were removed. In the 1980s re-activation, all the ships with 20 mm and 40 mm batteries had them removed, and four Phalanx CIWS mounts were added to all.

=== Oerlikon 20 mm anti-aircraft guns ===
The Oerlikon 20 mm anti-aircraft gun was one of the most heavily produced anti-aircraft guns of the Second World War; the US alone manufactured a total of 124,735 of these guns. When activated in 1941 these guns replaced the 0.50"/90 (12.7 mm) M2 Browning MG on a one-for-one basis. The Oerlikon 20 mm AA gun remained the primary anti-aircraft weapon of the United States Navy until the introduction of the 40 mm Bofors AA gun in 1943.

These guns were air-cooled and used a gas blowback recoil system. Unlike other automatic guns employed during World War II the barrel of the 20 mm Oerlikon gun did not recoil, the breechblock never locked against the breech and actually moved forward when the gun fired. This weapon lacked a counter-recoil brake, as the force of the counter-recoil was checked by the explosion of the next round of ammunition.

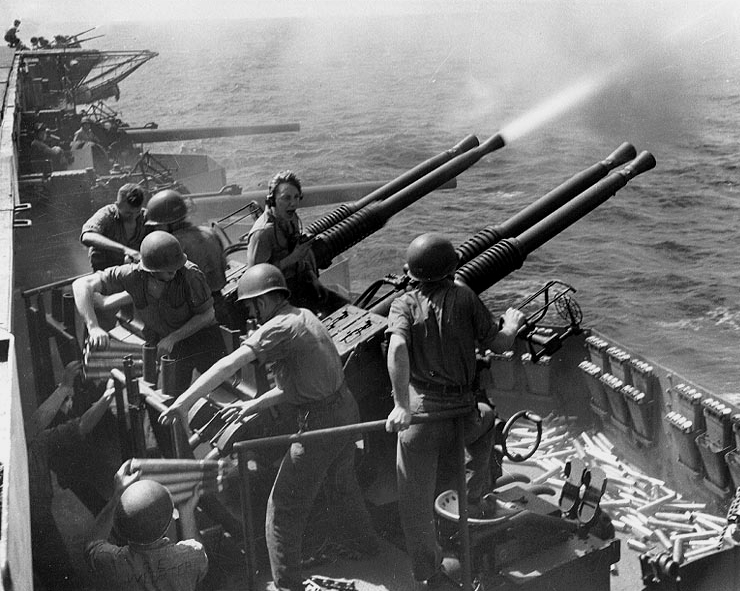
Bofors 40 mm anti-aircraft guns on a MK 12 quadruple mount fire from the deck of USS Hornet in World War II.

Between December 1941 and September 1944, 32% of all Japanese aircraft downed were credited to this weapon, with the high point being 48.3% for the second half of 1942. In 1943 the revolutionary Mark 14 Gun Sight was introduced which made these guns even more effective; however, the 20 mm guns were found to be ineffective against the Japanese Kamikaze attacks used during the latter half of World War II. They were subsequently phased out in favor of the heavier 40 mm Bofors AA guns.

=== Bofors 40 mm anti-aircraft guns ===
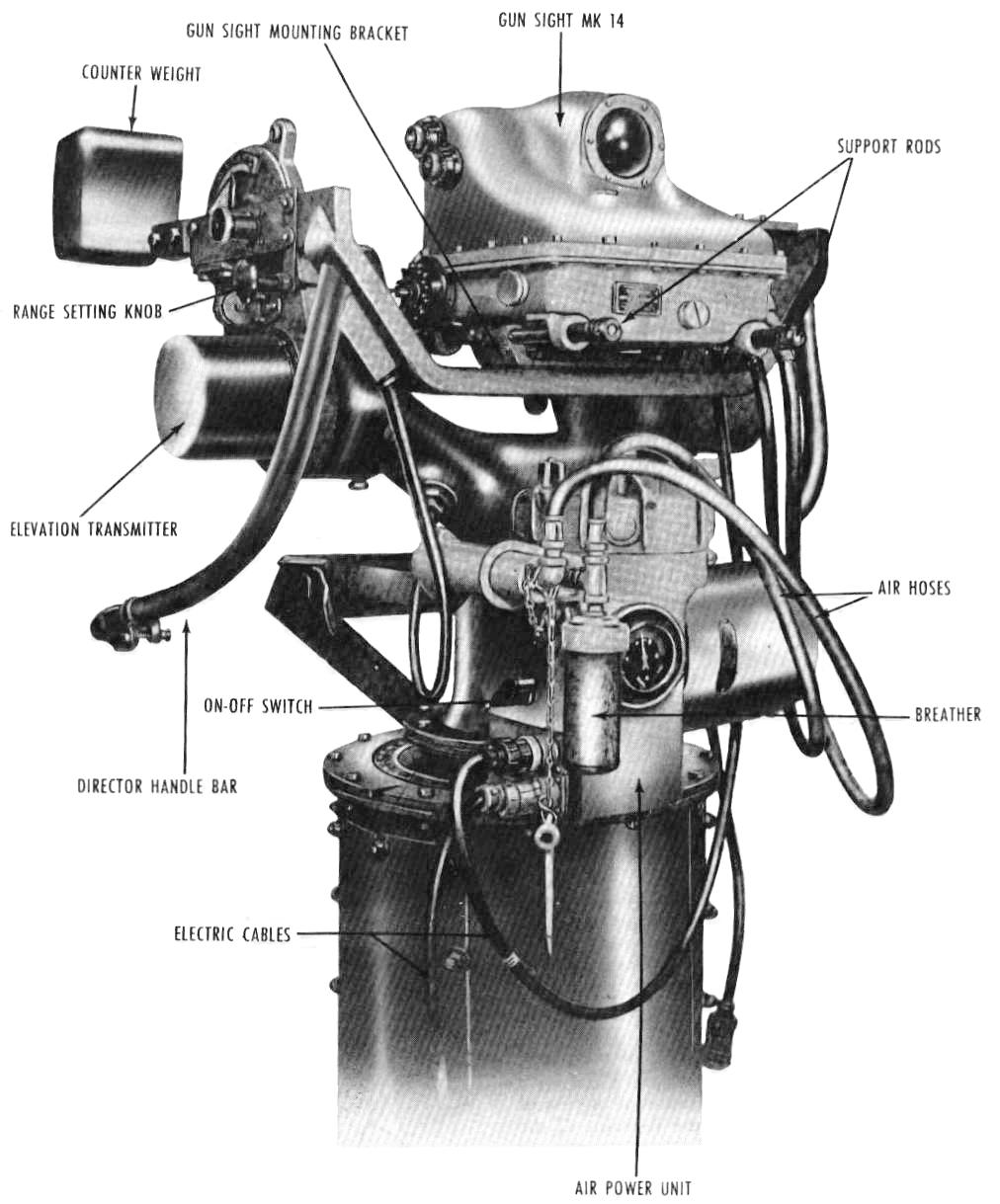
Mark 51 Director with Mark 14 (40 mm) Gun Sight

Arguably the best light anti-aircraft weapon of World War II, the 40 mm anti-aircraft gun was used on almost every major warship in the US and UK fleets during World War II from about 1943 to 1945. Although a descendant of German and Swedish designs, the Bofors mounts used by the US Navy during World War II had been heavily "Americanized" to bring the guns up to the standards placed on them by the US Navy. This resulted in a guns system set to English standards (now known as the Standard System) with interchangeable ammunition, which simplified the logistics situation for World War II. When coupled with electric-hydraulic drives for greater speed and the Mark 51 Director (pictured) for improved accuracy, the Bofors 40 mm gun became a fearsome adversary, accounting for roughly half of all Japanese aircraft shot down between 1 October 1944 and 1 February 1945.

When the Iowa-class battleships were launched in 1943 and 1944 they carried twenty quad Bofors 40 mm gun mounts, which they used for defense against enemy aircraft. These heavy guns were also employed in the protection of allied aircraft carriers operating in the Pacific Theater of World War II. These guns remained on the battleships Iowa, Missouri, and Wisconsin from the time they were commissioned until they were reactivated for service in the 1980s. As each battleship arrived for modernization during the early and mid-1980s the Bofors mounts that remained aboard were removed due in large part to the ineffectiveness of such manually aimed weapons against modern day jet fighters and enemy missiles. The replacement for the Bofors guns was the US Navy's Phalanx Close-in weapon system (CIWS).

=== Phalanx CIWS ===
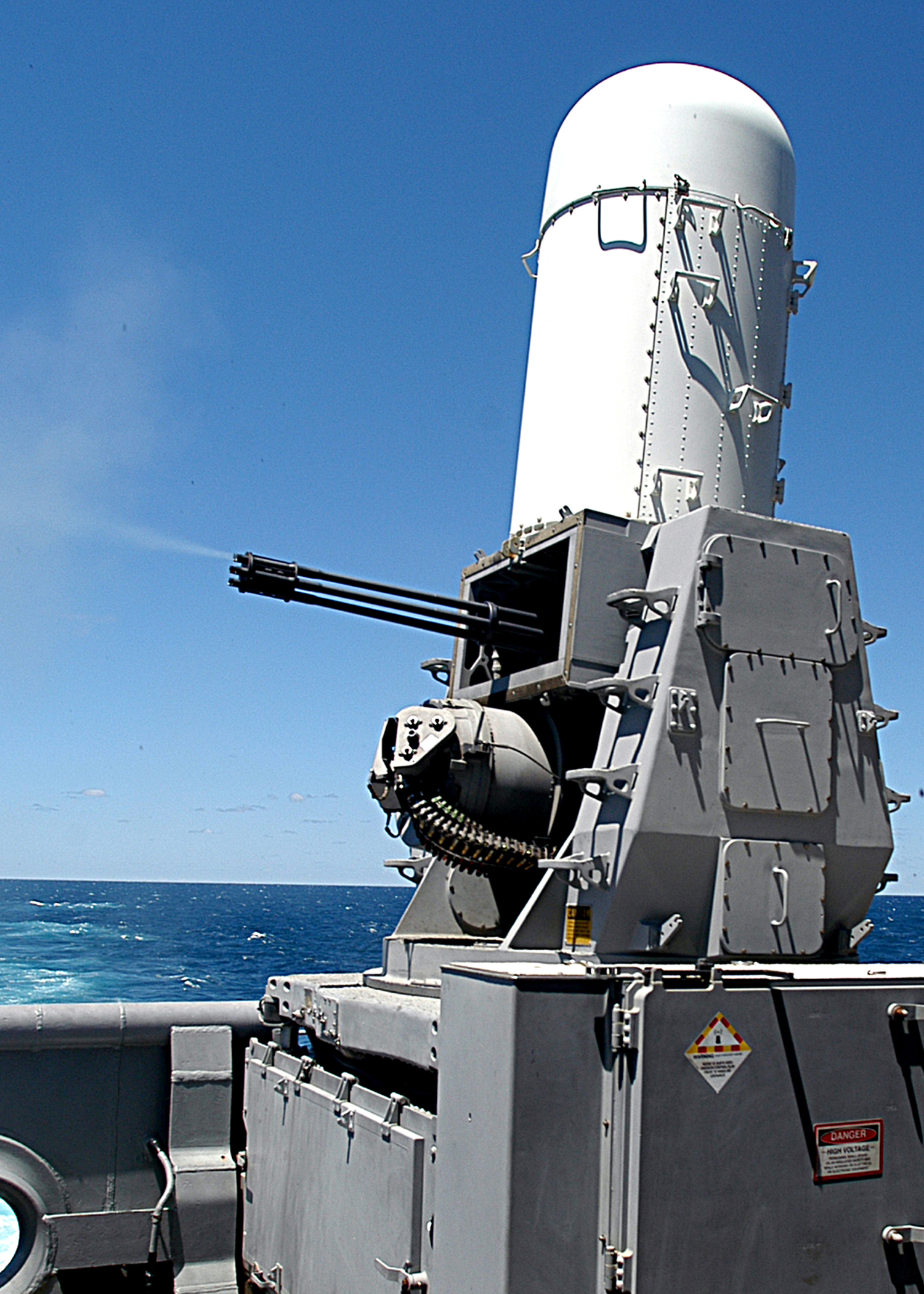
A Phalanx CIWS mount aboard the amphibious assault ship USS Kearsarge.

During their modernization in the 1980s, each Iowa-class battleship was equipped with four of the US Navy's Phalanx CIWS mounts, two of which sat just behind the bridge and two which were forward and outboard of the after ship's funnel. Iowa, New Jersey, and Missouri were equipped with the Block 0 version of the Phalanx, while Wisconsin received the first operational Block 1 version in 1988.

Developed as the final line of defense (terminal defense or point defense) against anti-ship missiles, the Phalanx Close in Weapon System (CIWS, pronounced "sea-whiz") is the anti-aircraft/anti-missile gun currently in use in the US Navy. Due to their distinctive shape, they have been nicknamed "R2D2s", in reference to the droid R2-D2 from the Star Wars universe. Designed in the early 1970s by General Dynamics, and currently produced by Raytheon, the Phalanx CIWS mount utilizes a 20 mm M61 Vulcan Gatling-style cannon to destroy enemy missiles and aircraft that manage to escape surface-to-air missiles fired from friendly ships.

The Phalanx guns work by using a search radar and a tracking radar to follow targets that approach within 1 to 1.5 nautical miles (2.8 km) of the vessel. When a target is within this range the CIWS mount moves to track the target while simultaneously evaluating the target against several preset criteria to determine the next course of action. Depending on whether the target criteria are met, the Phalanx mount automatically engages the incoming target if it is judged to be hostile in nature, or the system recommends that the Phalanx operator engage the target.

Phalanx CIWS mounts were used by Missouri and Wisconsin during the 1991 Gulf War; Wisconsin alone fired 5,200 20 mm Phalanx CIWS rounds. Missouri also received Phalanx fire during a "friendly fire" incident in which the Oliver Hazard Perry-class guided missile frigate USS Jarrett mistook chaff fired by Missouri for a legitimate target and shot at Missouri. Rounds from this attack struck the ship in the bulkhead above the famed "surrender deck" and bounced off the armor, one round penetrated the forward funnel and passed completely through it, and another round penetrated a bulkhead and embedded in an interior passageway of the ship.

== Missiles ==
During the modernization in the 1980s, three new weapons were added to the Iowa-class battleships. The first was the CIWS anti-aircraft/anti-missile system. The other two were missiles for use against both land and sea targets. At one point the NATO Sea Sparrow was to be installed on the reactivated battleships; however, it was determined that the system could not withstand the over-pressure effects when the main battery was fired.

=== Tomahawk land attack missile ===
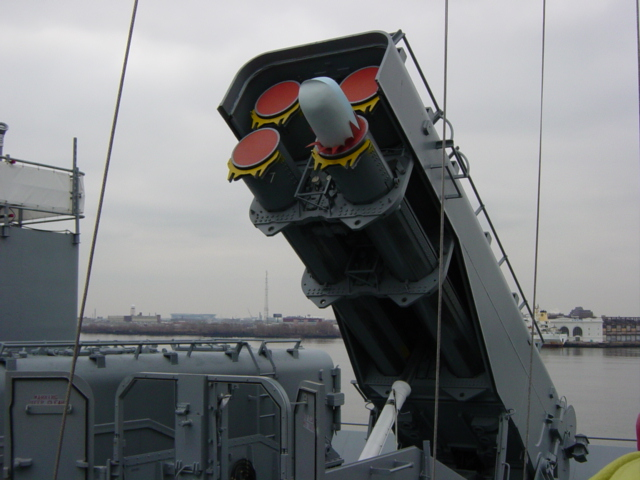
An Armored Box Launcher on the battleship USS New Jersey.

The BGM-109 Tomahawk Land Attack Missile (TLAM) was first introduced in the 1970s, and entered service with the United States in 1983. Designed as a long-range, all-weather, subsonic cruise missile, the Tomahawk was capable of reaching targets at a much greater range than the 16-inch (406 mm) guns on the Iowa-class ships. When added to the battleships in the 1980s the Tomahawk became the longest-ranged weapon carried by the battleships.

Owing to the original 1938 design of the battleships, the Tomahawk missiles could not be fitted to the Iowa class unless the battleships were physically rebuilt to accommodate the missile launchers. This realization prompted the removal of the anti-aircraft guns previously installed on the Iowas and the removal of four of each of the battleships' ten 5"/38 DP mounts. The mid and aft sections of the battleships' superstructure was then rebuilt to accommodate the launchers. This resulted in the construction of two separate platforms, one located between the funnels and one located behind the aft funnel, on which MK-143 Armored Box Launcher (ABL) canisters were installed. Each Armored Box Launcher carried four missiles, and each of the battleships was fitted with eight ABLs, enabling the Iowa-class to carry and fire a total of 32 Tomahawk missiles.

The type of Tomahawk carried by the battleships varied, as there were three basic configurations for the Tomahawk: the Anti-Ship Missile (TASM), the Land-Attack Missile-Conventional (TLAM-C), and the Land-Attack Missile-Nuclear (TLAM-N). Each version was similar in appearance and used the same airframe body and launcher. The conventional Tomahawk missile could carry a 1,000 lb (450 kg) explosive warhead or submunitions which used the missile body to reach their destination. The nuclear variant carried a 200 kt W80 nuclear warhead.

The TLAM could be equipped with an inertial and terrain contour matching (TERCOM) radar guidance package to find and destroy its target. The TERCOM radar used a stored map reference to compare with the actual terrain to determine the missile's position. If necessary, a course correction was then made to place the missile on course to the target. Terminal guidance in the target area was provided by the optical Digital Scene Matching Area Correlation (DSMAC) system, which compared a stored image of the target with the actual target image.

The firing weight of the Tomahawk was 2,650 lb (1,200 kg) plus a 550 lb (250 kg) booster. It had a cruising speed of 0.5 Mach and an attack speed of 0.75 Mach. The anti-ship version of the Tomahawk had an operating range of 250 nmi (460 km) and a maximum range of 470 nmi (870 km), while the conventional land attack missile version had a maximum range of 675 nmi (1,250 km) and TLAM-N had maximum range of 1,500 nmi (2,800 km).

During the 1991 Gulf War, USS Missouri and USS Wisconsin used ABL launchers to fire Tomahawk missiles at Iraqi targets during Operation Desert Storm. Wisconsin served as the Tomahawk Land Attack Missile (TLAM) strike commander for the Persian Gulf, directing the sequence of launches that marked the opening of Operation Desert Storm and fired a total of 24 of her own TLAMs during the first two days of the campaign.

=== Harpoon anti-ship missile ===
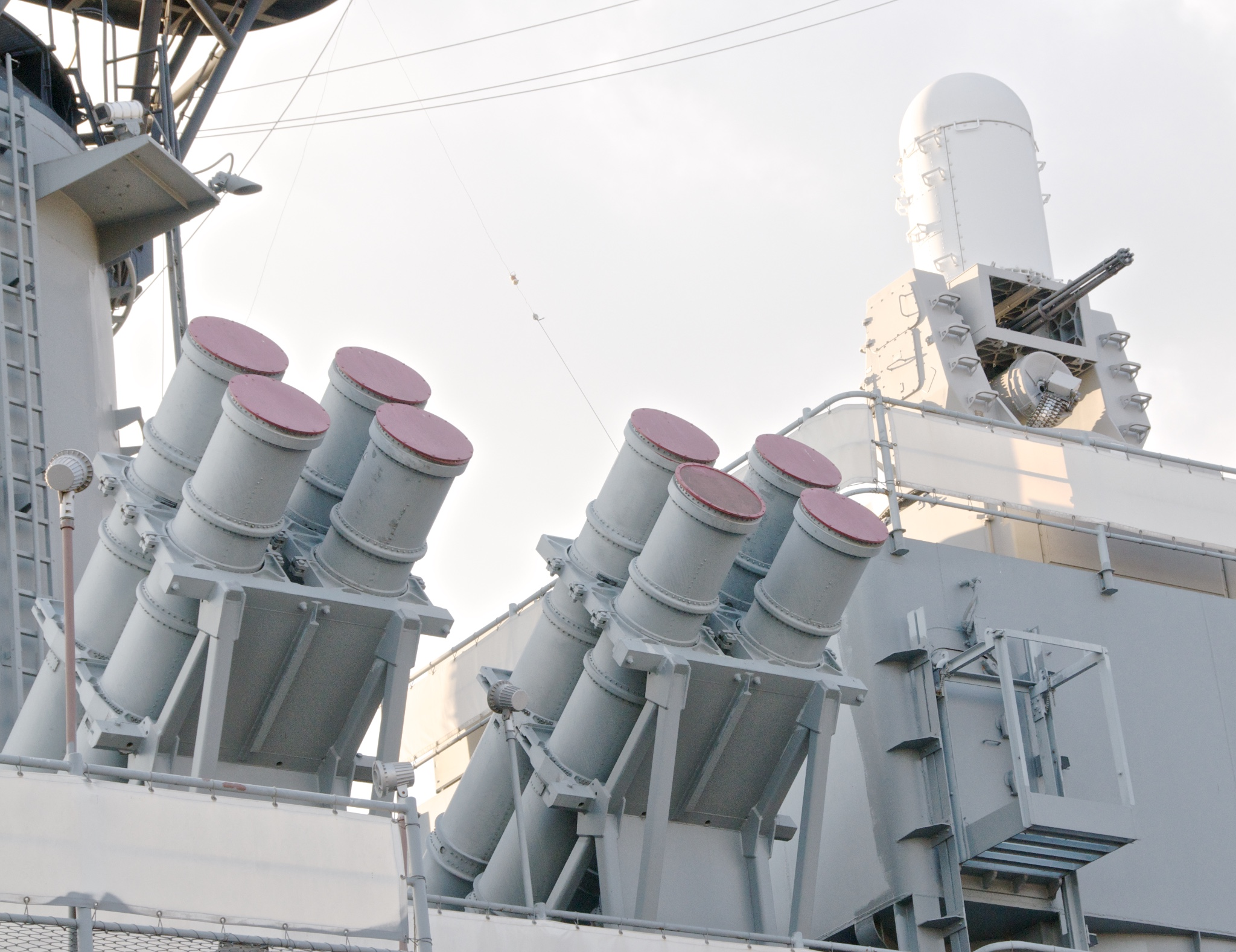
Two Harpoon Missile Launchers and a Phalanx CIWS on the USS New Jersey

For protection against enemy ships, the Iowa class was outfitted with the Harpoon Weapons System. The system consisted of four Mk 141 "shock-hardened" quad cell launchers designed to carry and fire the McDonnell Douglas RGM-84 Harpoon anti-ship missile. Each Harpoon was placed in one of four Mk 141 launchers located alongside the aft stack; eight per side, in two pods of four. The weight of the Harpoon at firing was 1,530 lb (690 kg), which included a booster weighing about 362 lb (164 kg). The cruising speed was 0.87 Mach and the maximum range was 64 nmi (119 km) in Range and Bearing Launch mode and 85 nmi (157 km) in Bearing Only Launch mode.

When an Iowa-class battleship fired a Harpoon missile, a booster propelled the missile away from the ship; after approximately 5 miles (8 km), the booster dropped away. After the booster was discarded a turbojet engine ignited and propelled the missile to the target. The stabilizing and actuator fins, which helped to guide the missile to its target, were stored folded in the canister and sprang into position after launching. These fins directed the missile to the target through inputs from the AN/SWG-1 Harpoon Fire Control System.

The battleships carried and used the RGM/UGM-84 variants of the Harpoon missile, which was designed to be fired by surface ships. The version used a solid-fueled rocket booster in an A/B44G-2 or -3 booster section, which was discarded after burn-out. The maximum range was around 140 kilometres (76 nmi).

After launch, the missile was guided towards the target location as determined by the ship using a three-axis Attitude Reference Assembly (ATA) in an AN/DSQ-44 guidance section. The ATA was less accurate than a full-fledged inertial system, but good enough for Harpoon's range. For stabilization and control, the AGM-84A had four fixed cruciform wings (3x BSU-42/B, 1x BSU-43/B) and four movable BSU-44/B tail fins. The missile flew at a low cruise altitude and at a predetermined distance from the expected target position, its AN/DSQ-28 J-band active radar seeker in the nose was activated to acquire and lock on the target. The radar switch-on distance could be set to lower or higher values, the former requiring a more precisely-known target location but reducing the risk to be defeated by enemy Electronic Counter Measures (ECM).

An alternative launch mode was called Bearing-Only Launch (BOL). In this mode, the missile was launched in the general direction of the target, and its radar activated from the beginning to scan for the target in a +/- 45° sector in front of the flight path. Once a target was located and the seeker locked the xGM-84A missile climbed rapidly to about 1800 m before diving on the target in what was known as a "pop-up maneuver". The 221 kg (488 lb) WDU-18/B penetrating blast-fragmentation warhead (in the WAU-3(V) /B warhead section) was triggered by a time-delayed impact fuze. When no target was acquired after radar activation, the Harpoon would self-destruct.
