= List of nuclear weapons =

World's atomic warhead designs, 1945–present

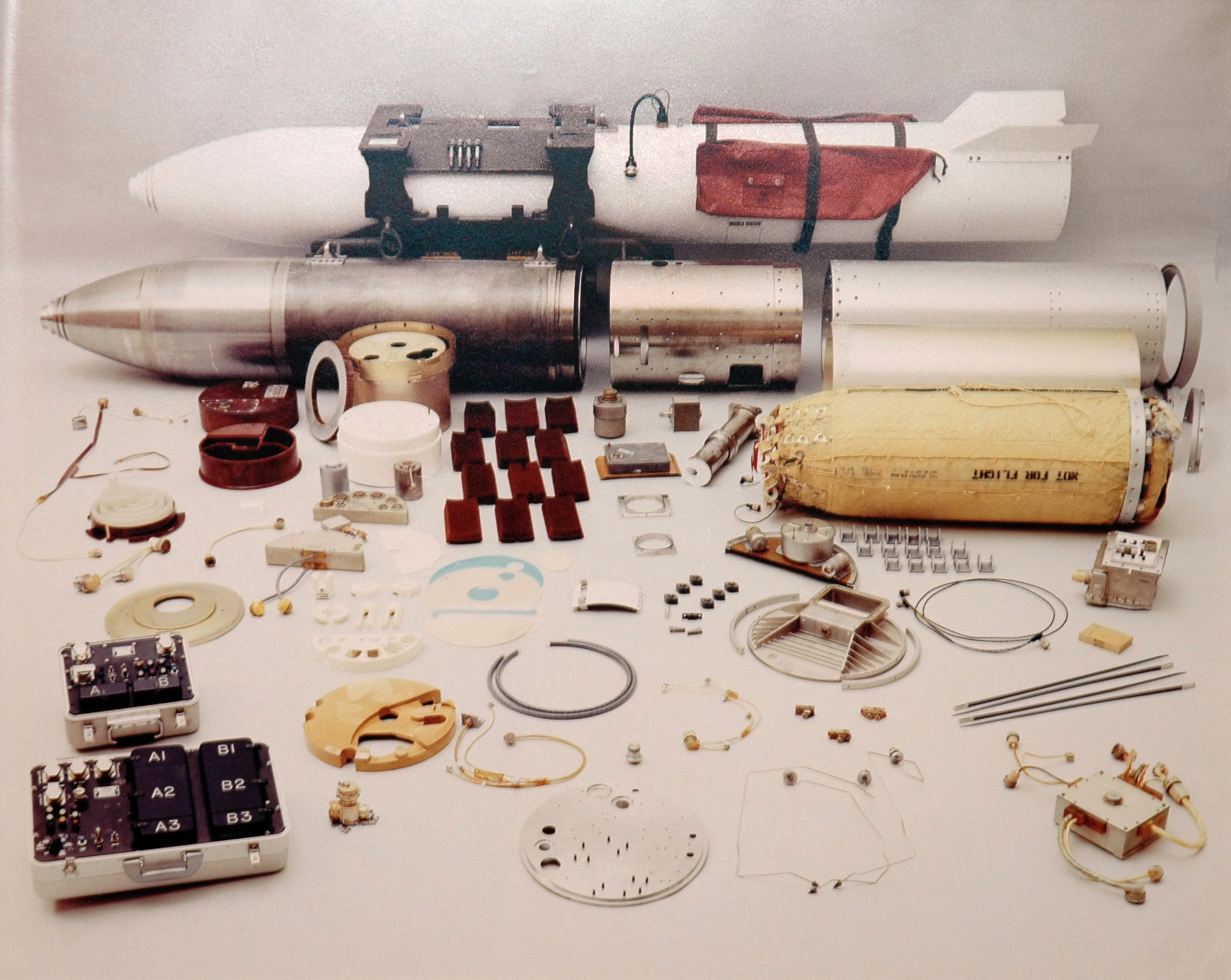
The components of a B83 nuclear bomb used by the United States

This is a list of nuclear weapons listed according to country of origin, and then by type within the states. The United States, Russia, China and India are known to possess a nuclear triad, being capable to deliver nuclear weapons by land, sea and air.

== United States ==
American nuclear weapons of all types – bombs, warheads, shells, and others – are numbered in the same sequence starting with the Mark 1 and (as of March 2006) ending with the W91 (which was cancelled prior to introduction into service). All designs which were formally intended to be weapons at some point received a number designation. Pure test units which were experiments (and not intended to be weapons) are not numbered in this sequence.

Early weapons were very large and could only be used as free fall bombs. These were known by "Mark" designators, like the Mark 4 which was a development of the Fat Man weapon. As weapons became more sophisticated they also became much smaller and lighter, allowing them to be used in many roles. At this time the weapons began to receive designations based on their role; bombs were given the prefix "B", while the same warhead used in other roles, like missiles, would normally be prefixed "W". For instance, the W-53 warhead was also used as the basis for the B53 nuclear bomb. Such examples share the same sequence number.

In other cases, when the modifications are more significant, variants are assigned their own number. An example is the B61 nuclear bomb, which was the parent design for the W80, W81, and W84. There are also examples of out-of-sequence numbering and other prefixes used in special occasions.

This list includes weapons which were developed to the point of being assigned a model number (and in many cases, prototypes were test fired), but which were then cancelled prior to introduction into military service. Those models are listed as cancelled, along with the year or date of cancellation of their program.

- Bombs – designated with Mark ("Mk") numbers until 1968, and with "B" numbers after that. "Test Experimental" bombs designated with "TX".
  - Mark 1 – "Little Boy" gun-type uranium weapon (used against Hiroshima). (13–18 kilotons, 1945–1950)
  - Mark 2 – "Thin Man" plutonium gun design—cancelled in 1944 as not suitable for the plutonium produced i.e. plutonium-239 but with plutonium-240 isotope impurities.
    - Implosion Mark 2 – Another Manhattan Project plutonium implosion weapon, a hollow pit implosion design, was also sometimes referred to as Mark 2. Also cancelled 1944.
  - Mark 3 – "Fat Man" plutonium implosion weapon (used against Nagasaki), effectively the same as the "Gadget" device used in the Trinity nuclear test with minor design differences. (21 kilotons, 1945–1950)
  - Mark 4 – Post-war "Fat Man" redesign. Bomb designed with weapon characteristics as the foremost criteria. (1949–1953)
  - Mark 5 – Significantly smaller high efficiency nuclear bomb. (1–120 kilotons, 1952–1963)
  - Mark 6 – Improved version of Mk-4. (8–160 kilotons, 1951–1962)
  - Mark 7 – Multi-purpose tactical bomb. (8–61 kilotons, 1952–1967)
  - Mark 8 – Gun-assembly, HEU weapon designed for penetrating hardened targets. (25–30 kilotons, 1951–1957)
  - Mark 10 – Improved version of Mk-8 (12–15 kilotons, cancelled May 1952).
  - Mark 11 – Re-designed Mk-8. Gun-type (8–30 kilotons).
  - Mark 12 – Light-weight bomb to be carried by fighter aircraft (12–14 kilotons).
  - Mark 13 – Improved version of Mk-6 (cancelled August 1954).
  - TX/Mark 14 – First deployable solid-fuel thermonuclear bomb (Castle Union device). Only five produced. (5 Megatons)
  - Mark 15 – First "lightweight" thermonuclear weapon. (1.7–3.8 Megatons, 1955–1965)
  - TX/Mark 16 – First weaponized thermonuclear weapon (Ivy Mike device). Only cryogenic weapon ever deployed. Only five produced. (6–8 Megatons)
  - Mark 17 – High-yield thermonuclear. Heaviest U.S. weapon, second highest yield of any U.S. weapon. Very similar to Mk-24. (10–15 Megatons)
  - Mark 18 – Very high yield fission weapon (Ivy King device).
  - Mark 20 – Improved Mark 13 (cancelled 1954)
  - Mark 21 – Re-designed variant of Castle Bravo test
  - Mark 22 – Failed thermonuclear design (Castle Koon device, cancelled April 1954).
  - Mark 24 – High-yield thermonuclear, very similar to Mk-17 but had a different secondary.
  - Mark 26 – Similar design to Mk 21 (cancelled 1956).
  - Mark 27 – Navy nuclear bomb (1958–1965)
  - Mk 101 Lulu (1958–1971)
  - Mk 105 Hotpoint (1958–1965)
  - B28 nuclear bomb (Mark 28) (1958–1991)
  - Mark 36 – Strategic nuclear bomb (1956–1961) 6–19 Megatons
  - Mark 39 (1957–1966)
  - B41 nuclear bomb (Mark 41) (1960–1976); highest yield US nuclear weapon (25 Megatons).
  - B43 nuclear bomb (Mark 43) (1961–1991)
  - B46 nuclear bomb or (Mark 46); experimental, design evolved into B53 nuclear bomb and W-53 warhead (cancelled 1958)
  - Mark 90 nuclear bomb (1952–1960)
  - B53 nuclear bomb (1962–1997; dismantled 2010–2011)
  - B57 nuclear bomb (1963–1993)
  - B61 nuclear bomb (1966–present)
  - B77 nuclear bomb (cancelled 1977)
  - B83 nuclear bomb (1983–present)
  - B90 nuclear bomb (cancelled 1991)
  - Robust Nuclear Earth Penetrator design program (2001–2005, cancelled)
  - B94 nuclear bomb
- Nuclear artillery shells
  - 16-inch (406 mm)
    - W23 (1956–1962) gun-type
  - 11-inch (280 mm)
    - W9 (1952–1957) gun-type
    - W19 (1953–1956) gun-type, W9 derivative
  - 8-inch (203 mm)
    - W33 (1956–1980s) gun-type
    - W75 (cancelled 1973)
    - W79 (1981–1992)
  - There were/are also nuclear warheads for the Army's 175 mm (6.9-inch) and 155 mm (6.1-inch) artillery.
    - W48 (1963–1992)
    - W74 (cancelled 1973)
    - W82 (cancelled 1983 (W-82-0 Enhanced Radiation) and 1990 (W-82-1 fission only))
- Atomic Demolition Munitions
  - W7/ADM-B (c. 1954–1967)
  - T4 ADM (1957–1963) Gun-type
  - W30/Tactical Atomic Demolition Munition (1961–1966)
  - W31/ADM (1960–1965)
  - W45/Medium Atomic Demolition Munition (1964–1984)
  - W54/Special Atomic Demolition Munition (1965–1989)
- Missile and Rocket warheads
  - W4 for SM-62 Snark cruise missile (cancelled 1951)
  - W5 for MGM-1 Matador cruise missile (1954–1963)
  - W7 for MGR-1 Honest John artillery rocket (1954–1960), MGM-5 Corporal TBM (1955–1964), Nike Hercules SAM, and BOAR air-to-surface rocket (ASR) (1958–1960s)
  - W8 for SSM-N-8 Regulus cruise missile, Gun-type (cancelled 1955)
  - W12 for RIM-8 Talos SAM (cancelled 1955)
  - W13 for SM-62 Snark cruise missile and PGM-11 Redstone SRBM (cancelled 1954)
  - W15 for SM-62 Snark cruise missile (cancelled 1957)
  - W21 for SM-64 Navaho cruise missile (cancelled 1957)
  - W25 for MB-1 "Ding Dong", later AIR-2 Genie AAR (1957–1984)
  - W27 for SSM-N-8 Regulus and SSM-N-9 Regulus II cruise missile (1958–1965)
  - W28 for AGM-28 Hound Dog and MGM-13 Mace cruise missiles (1958–1976)
  - W29 for SM-64 Navaho cruise missile, PGM-11 Redstone SRBM, and SM-62 Snark cruise missile (cancelled 1955)
  - W30 for RIM-8 Talos SAM (1959–1979)
  - W31 for MGR-1 Honest John artillery rocket (1961–1985), Nike Hercules SAM (1960s–1988)
  - W34 for Mk 101 Lulu depth charge, Mark 45 ASTOR torpedo, Mk 105 Hotpoint bomb (1958–1976)
  - W35 for SM-65 Atlas ICBM, HGM-25A Titan I ICBM, PGM-17 Thor IRBM, and PGM-19 Jupiter MRBM (cancelled 1958)
  - W37 (cancelled 1956)
  - W38 for SM-65 Atlas ICBM and HGM-25A Titan I ICBM (1961–1965)
  - W39 for PGM-11 Redstone SRBM (1958–1964)
  - W40 for MGM-18 Lacrosse TBM, CIM-10 Bomarc SAM (1959–1972)
  - W41 for SM-64 Navaho cruise missile (cancelled 1957)
  - W42 for MIM-23 Hawk SAM, AIM-47 Falcon AAM, AAM-N-10 Eagle AAM (cancelled 1961)
  - W44 for RUR-5 ASROC SSM (1961–1989)
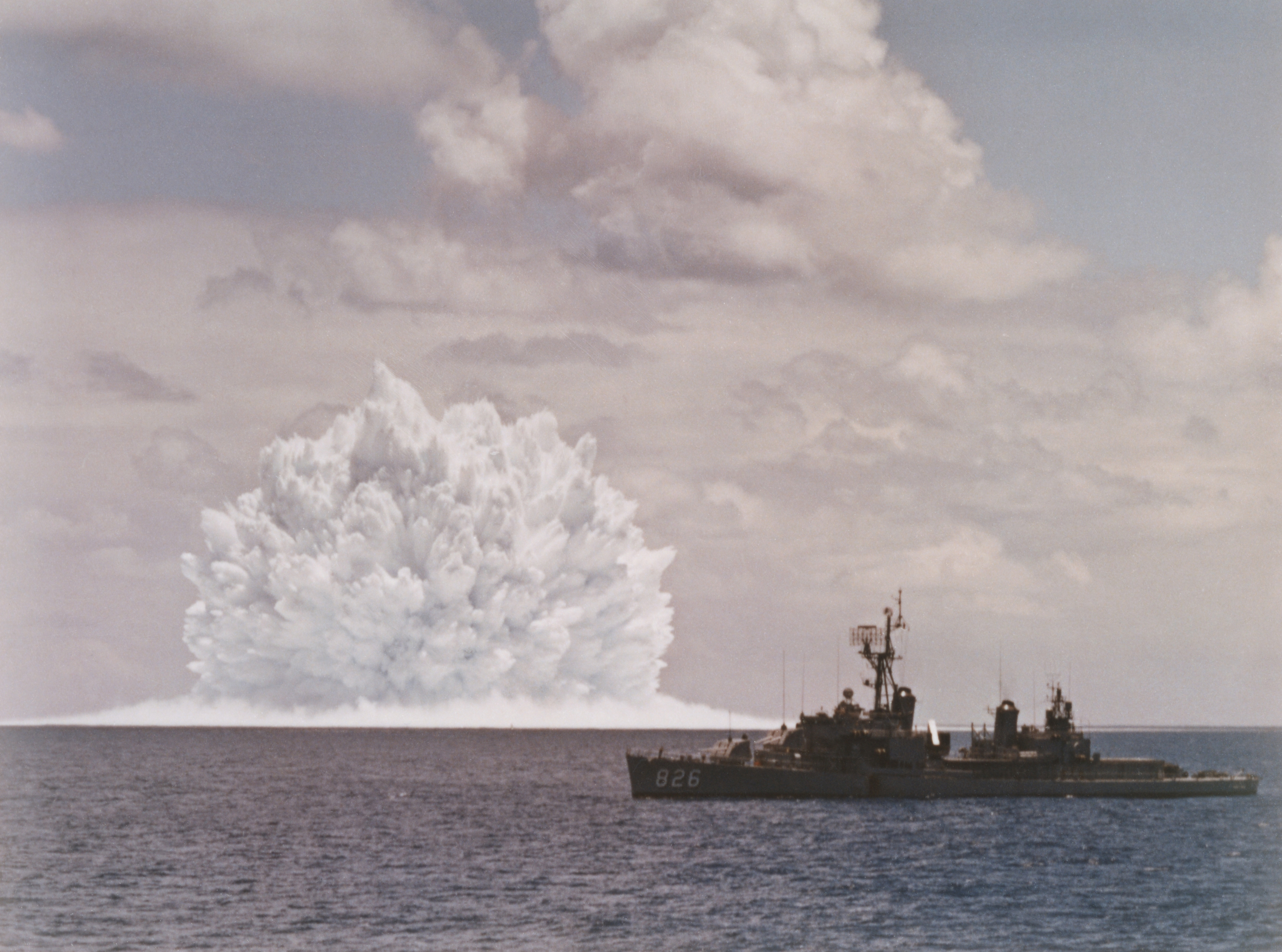
    1962 test of an ASROC antisubmarine rocket armed with the W44
  - W45 for MGR-3 Little John artillery rocket, RIM-2 Terrier SAM, and AGM-12 Bullpup ASM (1961–1969 (some 1988))
  - XW-46 for PGM-11 Redstone SRBM and SM-62 Snark cruise missile (cancelled 1958)
  - W47 for UGM-27 Polaris A-1 and A-2 SLBMs (1960–1974)
  - W49 for PGM-19 Jupiter MRBM (1959–1963) and PGM-17 Thor IRBM (1959–1963)
  - W50 for MGM-31 Pershing SRBM, and Hopi ASR (1960–1990)
  - XW-51 for various (program converted to W54 in 1959)
  - W52 for MGM-29 Sergeant TBM (1962–1977)
  - W53 for LGM-25C Titan II ICBM (1962–1987)
  - W54 for Davy Crockett recoilless rifle, AIM-26 Falcon AAM, and AIM-4 Falcon AAM (1961–1972)
  - W55 for UUM-44 SUBROC SSM (1965–1989)
  - W56 for LGM-30 Minuteman I and II ICBMs (1963–1993)
  - W58 for UGM-27 Polaris A-3 SLBM (1964–1982)
  - W59 for LGM-30 Minuteman I ICBM and GAM-87 Skybolt ALBM (1962–1969)
  - W60 for RIM-50 Typhon SAM (cancelled 1963)
  - W61 for MGM-134 Midgetman (cancelled 1992)
  - W62 for LGM-30 Minuteman III ICBM, (1970–2010)
  - W63 for MGM-52 Lance TBM (warhead cancelled 1966)
  - W64 for MGM-52 Lance TBM (warhead cancelled 1964)
  - W65 for Sprint ABM (cancelled 1968)
  - W66 for Sprint ABM (available 1970–1975)
  - W67 for UGM-73 Poseidon SLBM and LGM-30 Minuteman III ICBM (cancelled 1967)
  - W68 for UGM-73 Poseidon SLBM (1970–1991)
  - W69 for AGM-69 SRAM ASM (1972–1990)
  - W70 for MGM-52 Lance TBM (deployed 1973–1992)
  - W71 for LIM-49A Spartan ABM (deployed 1974–1975; dismantled 1992)
  - W72 for AGM-62 Walleye glide bomb (1970–1979)
  - W73 for AGM-53 Condor ASM (cancelled 1970)
  - W76 for UGM-96 Trident I and UGM-133 Trident II SLBMs (1978–present)
  - W78 for LGM-30 Minuteman III ICBM (1979–present)
  - W80 for AGM-86, AGM-129, BGM-109 Tomahawk, and AGM-181 LRSO cruise missiles (1981–present)
  - W81 for RIM-67 Standard ER SAM, based on B61 (cancelled 1986)
  - W84 for BGM-109G Gryphon cruise missile (1983–1991)
  - W85 for Pershing II MRBM and Pershing 1b SRBM (1983–1991)
  - W86 for Pershing II MRBM Earth penetrating warhead option (cancelled 1980)
  - W87 for LGM-118 Peacekeeper ICBM (1986–2005), LGM-30 Minuteman III ICBM (2007–present), and LGM-35 Sentinel ICBM (future)
    - W87-1 for MGM-134 Midgetman ICBM (cancelled 1992)
  - W88 for UGM-133 Trident II SLBM (1988–present)
  - W89 for AGM-131 SRAM II ASM and UUM-125 Sea Lance SSM (cancelled 1991)
  - W91 for SRAM-T ASM (cancelled 1991)
  - Reliable Replacement Warhead (RRW1) design program (2004–2008, cancelled)
  - W93 for UGM-133 Trident II SLBM (proposed)

See also Enduring Stockpile.

=== Common nuclear primaries ===
Several American weapons designs share common components. These include publicly identified models listed below.

Common nuclear fission primaries
Model	Used in these weapons
RACER IV primary	TX/Mark 14, TX/Mark 16, Mark 17
Python primary	B28 W28 W40 W49
Boa primary	W30 W52
Robin primary	W38 W45 W47
Tsetse primary	B43 W44 W50 B57 W59
Kinglet primary	W55 W58
B61 Family	B61 W69 W73 W80 W81 W84W85 W86

== Soviet Union/Russia ==
At the peak of its arsenal in 1988, Russia possessed around 45,000 nuclear weapons in its stockpile, roughly 13,000 more than the United States arsenal, the second largest in the world, which peaked in 1966.

- Tests
- Torpedoes
  - 53–58 torpedo with 10 kilotons RDS-9 warhead
  - 65–73 torpedo with 20 kilotons
  - VA-111 Shkval with 150 kilotons
- Bombs
  - RDS-1, 22 kiloton bomb. Tested 29 August 1949 as "First Light" (Joe 1). Total of 5 stockpiled
  - RDS-2, 38 kiloton bomb. Tested 24 September 1951 as "Second Light." The RDS-2 was an entirely Russian design, delayed by development of the RDS-1
  - RDS-3, 42 kiloton bomb. First Soviet bomb tested in an airdrop on 18 October 1951. First 'mass-produced" Soviet bomb
  - RDS-3I, 62 kiloton bomb. Tested 24 October 1954. The RDS-31 was an improved RDS-3 with external neutron generator
  - RDS-4, "Tatyana" 42 kiloton bomb. The RDS-4 was smaller and lighter than previous Soviet Bombs.
  - RDS-5
  - RDS-6, also known as RDS-6S, or "sloika" or "layer cake" gaining about 20% of its yield from fusion. RDS-6 was tested on 12 August 1953. Yield 400 kilotons
  - RDS-7, a backup for the RDS-6, the RDS-7 was a 500 kiloton all fission bomb comparable to the US Mk-18, development dropped after success of the RDS-6S
  - RDS-27, 250 kiloton bomb, a 'boosted' fission bomb tested 6 November 1955.
  - RDS-37, 3 megaton bomb, the first Soviet two-stage hydrogen bomb, tested 22 November 1955
  - RDS-220 Tsar Bomba an extremely large three stage bomb, initially designed as a 100-megaton-bomb, but was scaled down to 50 megatons for testing.
- Intercontinental Ballistic Missiles
  - RDS-9, 40 kiloton warhead for R-5M MRBM (SS-3)
  - RDS-37, 3 megaton warhead for R-7 Semyorka / SS-6 Sapwood ICBM
  - RDS-46, 5 megaton warhead for R-7A Semyorka / SS-6 Sapwood ICBM
  - 8F17, 3 megaton warhead for R-16 / SS-7 Saddler ICBM
  - 8F115 and 8F116, 5–6 megaton warhead for R-16 / SS-7 Saddler ICBM
  - Unknown model warheads for R-9 / SS-8 Sasin ICBM
  - 15F42 1.2 megaton warhead for UR-100 / SS-11 Mod 3 Sego ICBM
  - Unknown model 750 kiloton to 1.0 megaton warhead for RT-2 / SS-13 Mod 1 Savage ICBM
  - 15F1r 750 kiloton to 1.65 megaton warhead for RT-2 / SS-13 Mod 2 Savage ICBM
  - Unknown model 466 kiloton warhead for RT-2 / SS-13 Mod 3 Savage ICBM
  - Unknown model 500 kiloton warhead for RT-20 / SS-15 Scrooge ICBM
  - Unknown model 1.5 megaton warhead for RT-20 / SS-15 Scrooge ICBM
  - Unknown model 650 kiloton to 1.5 megaton warheads for RT-21 Temp 2S / SS-16 Sinner ICBM
  - Unknown model 300–750 kiloton warheads for MR-UR-100 Sotka / SS-17 Spanker Mod 1 ICBM
  - Unknown model 4–6 megaton warhead for MR-UR-100 Sotka / SS-17 Spanker Mod 2 ICBM
  - 8F675 (Mod2) 20 megaton warhead for R-36M2 / SS-18 Satan ICBM
  - 8F021 2 or 5 megaton warheads for R-36MP / SS-18 Satan ICBM (3 MIRV warheads)
  - unknown 550 kiloton warheads for R-36M2 / SS-18 Satan ICBM (10 MIRV warheads)
  - Unknown model 750 kiloton warheads for R-36M2 / SS-18 Satan ICBM (10 MIRV warheads)
  - Unknown model 550 kiloton warheads for UR-100N / SS-19 Mod 1 Stiletto ICBM (6 MIRV warheads)
  - Unknown model 2.5–5 megaton warhead for UR-100N / SS-19 Mod 2 Stiletto ICBM
  - Unknown model 550 kiloton warheads for RT-23 Molodets / SS-24 Scalpel ICBM (10 MIRV warheads)
  - Unknown model 550 kiloton warhead for RT-2PM Topol / SS-25 Sickle ICBM
  - Unknown model 550 kiloton warhead for RT-2UTTH Topol M / SS-27 Sickle B ICBM
- Various tactical nuclear weapons including "suitcase bombs" (RA-115 or RA-115-01 as examples)

== United Kingdom ==
- Blue Steel
- Yellow Sun productionised air-delivered thermonuclear bomb casing.
- Warheads
  - Blue Danube Fission weapon.
  - Red Snow for Yellow Sun Mk.2.
  - Green Grass For Yellow Sun Mk.1.
  - Red Beard, tactical nuclear weapon.
  - WE.177 (also used as a nuclear depth charge).
  - Blue Cat – nuclear warhead a.k.a. Tony – UK version of US W44, a.k.a. Tsetse.
  - Blue Fox – kiloton range nuclear weapon, later renamed Indigo Hammer – not to be confused with the later Blue Fox radar.
  - Blue Peacock ten-kiloton nuclear land mine, a.k.a. the "chicken-powered nuclear bomb", originally 'Blue Bunny' It used the Blue Danube physics package.
  - Blue Rosette – short-case nuclear weapon bomb casing for reconnaissance bomber to spec R156T, including the Avro 730, Handley Page HP.100, English Electric P10, Vickers SP4 and various others.
  - Blue Slug – nuclear ship-to-ship missile using Sea Slug launcher.
  - Blue Water – nuclear armed surface to surface missile.
  - Green Bamboo – nuclear weapon.
  - Green Cheese – nuclear anti-ship missile.
  - Green Flash – Green Cheese's replacement.
  - Green Granite – nuclear weapons – Green Granite (small) & Green Granite (large).
  - Green Grass – nuclear weapon
  - Indigo Hammer – nuclear weapon
  - Orange Herald – fusion-boosted fission weapon. It is believed that the fusion boost didn't work, which would make it the most powerful fission bomb ever tested at 720 kt.
  - Violet Club – nuclear weapon

== France ==
France is said to have an arsenal of 350 nuclear weapons stockpiled as of 2002.

- Bombs
  - AN 11
  - AN 22
  - AN 52 (MR 50 CTC)
- Warheads (and missiles)
  - MR 31 (S2)
  - MR 41 (M1 and M2)
  - MR 50 CTC (AN 51 CTC and AN 52 CTC)
  - AN 51 CTC (Pluton)
  - AN 52 CTC (AN 52)
  - TN 60 (M20)
  - TN 61 (M20 and S3)
  - TN 70 MIRV (M4)
  - TN 71 MIRV (M4)
  - TN 75 MIRV (M45 and M51)
  - TN 76 MIRV (M5)
  - TN 80 (ASMP)
  - TN 81 (ASMP)
  - TN 90 (Hadès)
  - TNA (ASMP-A)
  - TNO MIRV (M51)

== China ==
As of 2025, China is believed to possess around 600 nuclear weapons, but has released very little information about the contents of its arsenal.

- Tests:
  - 596 (nuclear test)
  - Test No. 6
- Ballistic Missiles:
  - DF-1
  - DF-2
  - DF-3A
  - DF-4
  - DF-5
  - DF-11
  - DF-15
  - DF-17
  - DF-21
  - DF-31
  - DF-31B
  - DF-41
  - JL-1
  - JL-2
  - B-611
  - P-12
- Cruise Missiles
  - DH-10
  - CJ-10
  - HN1
  - HN2
  - HN3
  - CF-2
  - CF-1
  - SS-N-2

== India ==
Although India's nuclear programme and its details are highly classified, international figures suggest that India possesses about 180 nuclear weapons as per 2024 estimate. In 1999, India was estimated to have 800 kg of separated reactor-grade plutonium, with a total amount of 8,300 kg of civilian plutonium, enough for approximately 1,000 nuclear weapons.

== Israel ==
Israel is widely believed to possess a substantial arsenal of nuclear weapons and missiles, estimated at 75–130 and 100–200 warheads, but refuses officially to confirm or deny whether it has a nuclear weapon program, leaving the details of any such weapons unclear. Mordechai Vanunu, a former nuclear technician for Israel, confirmed the existence of a nuclear weapons program in 1986.

Unconfirmed rumors have hinted at tactical nuclear artillery shells, light fission bombs and missile warheads, and perhaps thermonuclear missile warheads.

The BBC News Online website published an article on 28 May 2008, which quotes former U.S. President Jimmy Carter as stating that Israel has at least 150 nuclear weapons. The article continues to state that this is the second confirmation of Israel's nuclear capability by a U.S. spokesman following comments from U.S. Defense Secretary Robert Gates at a Senate hearing and had apparently been confirmed a short time later by Israeli Prime Minister Ehud Olmert.

== Pakistan ==
As of 2024, Pakistan is believed to possess about 170 nuclear weapon devices and the specifications of these weapon systems and their productions are highly classified. The main series for nuclear transportation is Hatf (lit. Target).

== North Korea ==
North Korea claims to possess nuclear weapons, however, the specifications of its systems are not public. It is estimated to have 6–18 low yield nuclear weapons (August 2012 estimate). On 9 October 2006, North Korea achieved its first nuclear detonation.

On 25 May 2009, North Korea conducted a second test of nuclear weapons at the same location as the original test. The test weapon was of the same magnitude as the atomic bombs dropped on Japan in the 2nd World War. At the same time of the test, North Korea tested two short range ballistic missiles. The country tested a 7 kt nuclear weapon on 2 February 2013. On 3 September 2017, North Korea conducted an underground thermonuclear test which had an estimated yield of 100kt to 250kt, according to various sources.

On March 24, 2023, North Korea unveiled the Hwasan-31 tactical nuclear bomb with at least 10 warheads shown, each measuring an estimated 40 to 50 centimeters in diameter and 1 meter in length as reported by the South Korean media. Hwasong-11A (KN-23) and KN-25 ballistic missiles are capable of carrying it.

== South Africa ==
South Africa built six or seven gun-type weapons. All constructed weapons were verified by International Atomic Energy Agency and other international observers to have been dismantled along with the complete weapons program, although they still possess the highly enriched uranium.

== See also ==
- Lists of nuclear disasters and radioactive incidents
- Nuclear weapon yield
- Nuclear weapon
- Nuclear bunker buster
