= W25 (nuclear warhead) =

Small US nuclear warhead

W25 nuclear warhead
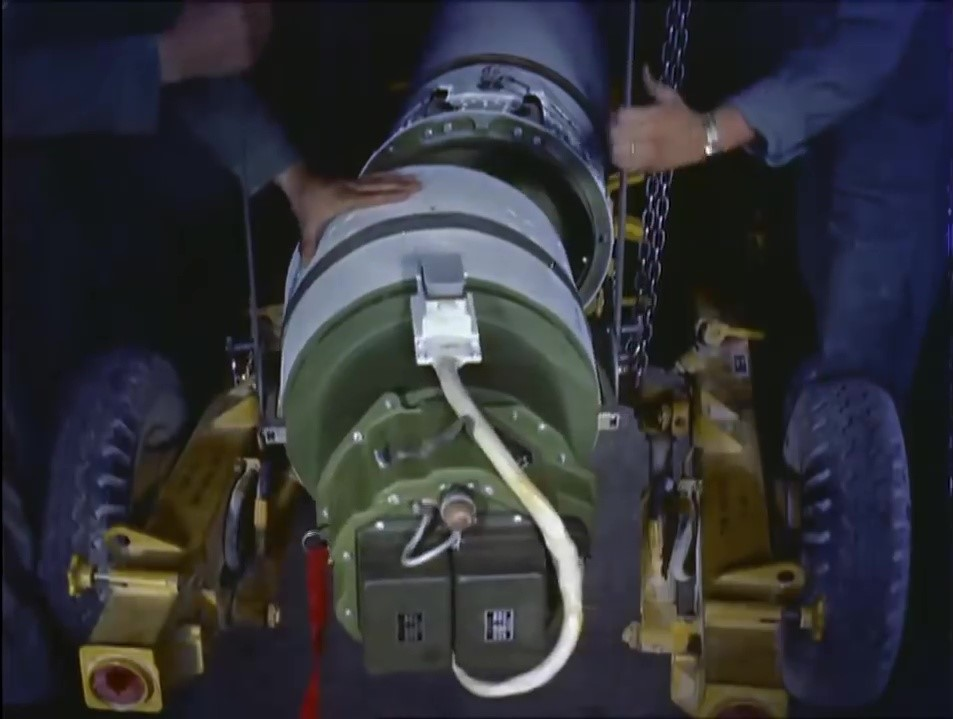
- W25 warhead being loaded onto an AIR-2 Genie rocket.
- Type: Nuclear weapon
- Place of origin: United States

Production history
- Designer: Los Alamos National Laboratory
- Designed: 1954 to 1956
- Produced: May 1957 to May 1960
- No. built: 3150
- Variants: 2

Specifications
- Mass: 220 lb (100 kg)
- Length: 26 in (660 mm)
- Diameter: 17.25 in (438 mm)
- Blast yield: 1.7 kilotonnes of TNT (7.1 TJ)

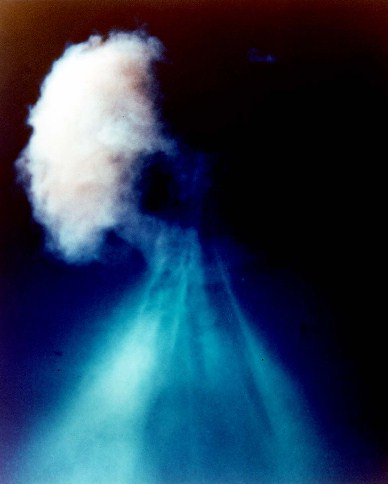
Plumbbob John Nuclear Test, a live test of nuclear AIR-2A Genie rocket on July 19th 1957. Fired by a US Air Force F-89J over Yucca Flats Nuclear Test Site at an altitude of 15,000 feet (4.6 km).

The W25 was a small nuclear warhead that was developed by the Los Alamos Scientific Laboratory for air-defense use. It was a fission device with a nominal yield of 1.7 kt.

The W25 was used for the MB-1 "Ding Dong", an unguided air-to-air rocket used by US Northrop F-89 Scorpion, F-101 Voodoo, and F-106 Delta Dart interceptor aircraft, and Canadian CF-101 Voodoo aircraft, as part of NATO nuclear sharing. The MB-1 entered service in 1957 and was eventually redesignated the AIR-2 Genie. Limited numbers were carried by Air National Guard F-106 aircraft until December 1984.

== History ==
=== Genie application ===
The W25 program began in March 1951, when the Division of Military Application suggested that the use of nuclear weapons to blunt enemy aircraft attacks be examined. However, little immediate action was taken because the state-of-the-art in both warheads and missiles was not yet advanced enough for the proposal to be practicable.

Technology soon improved and, by February 1952, the Joint Chiefs of Staff requested that the Joint Air Board study the matter. The study was completed in January 1953, which suggested that gun-, rocket- and missile-carried warheads were possible, launched from interceptor and bomber aircraft. The board specifically recommended the development of nuclear warheads for the RIM-8 Talos, CIM-10 Bomarc and MIM-3 Nike Ajax surface-to-air missiles. During discussions about the report, it was believed that tens of thousands of air defense warheads would be needed, and so the warheads would have to be economical in nuclear materials to reduce their cost.

At the same time, the US air force wanted a high-velocity, nuclear armed, air to air missile. The air force believed that, because air defenses operated under peacetime conditions, it was desirable to have the ability for a human to make confirmation that an unidentified aircraft was indeed hostile before engaging it.

Sandia National Laboratory had been investigating the high-altitude operation of nuclear weapons since 1952 and, in August 1953, concluded that the only major concern was high-voltage breakdown at low pressures. That meant that existing weapon-firing sets were unsuitable, so solutions were examined. It was soon decided that the problem could be solved through the use of a sealed nuclear weapon, with the weapon filled with high-pressure air to prevent electric arcing.

In October 1953, the air defense warhead programs took an unusual turn in that they avoided the then-trend to highly standardize nuclear and non-nuclear components of weapons. This was justified on the basis that air defense warheads needed to be readily available for use, needed to be highly resistant to premature detonation, and needed to economise the use of nuclear materials. Sandia conducted research into the optimum size of an air-to-air missile warhead and, in May 1954, the Atomic Energy Commission began development of an air-to-air nuclear warhead.

In May 1954, the military characteristics were specified for a 15 inches (380 mm) warhead. It would be capable of remaining at the ready condition for 30 days, be capable of 50 hours flight time at altitudes of up to 100,000 feet (30,000 m), and withstand temperatures of −90 to 165 °F (−68 to 74 °C). The warhead would be able to withstand acceleration of 100 g (980 m/s^{2}) along the longitudinal axis and 20 g (200 m/s^{2}) along perpendicular axes.

In June 1954, the warhead names Mark 25, Mark 30 and Mark 31 were formally adopted. The air force would be responsible for the rocket systems, including the arming and fusing system, while the AEC would supply the warhead and associated assembly, testing and handling equipment. The rocket for the warhead was initially named Ding Dong and was optimized for carriage on the F-86 Sabre, F-89 Scorpion and F-100 Super Sabre. The rocket was to be 15.5 inches (390 mm) in diameter, but excursions of up to 18 inches (460 mm) were to be investigated.

A study of yield to kill probability was published in November 1954. While higher yields increased the lethal radius of the weapon, higher yields required the launching range to be increased to allow for a safe escape by the launching aircraft. This reduced the accuracy of the weapon, eventually counteracting the advantage from the increased yield. Cost in nuclear material to kill was also studied, and it was found that the largest weapon diameter of 18 inches (460 mm) was most efficient in nuclear material. However, larger weapons required a larger rocket and caused aircraft compatibility problems. A diameter of 17.25 inches (438 mm) was eventually settled on.

In January 1955, the joint study group was dissolved and reformed as the Air-to-Air Rocket Joint Project Group. By that point, the weapon weighed approximately 230 lb (100 kg).

In March 1955, the assistant secretary for defense authorized the full development of the rocket and its warhead. In the same month, the air force expressed an urgent desire to have the weapon operational by 1957. Because of the numbers required, they requested that quantity production of the weapon begin but, because no firm production directive had been received, the AEC denied the request. The military liaison committee subsequently requested the warhead be in production by the rocket availability date of January 1957.

The weapon was to have maximum interchangeability of components with other weapons, provided that it did not compromise the weapon's sealed design. The weapon would be capable of storage in a ready-to-operate condition for at least 30 days, with 90 days being desirable, as long as such a requirement did not delay the production date. The warhead would be capable of operation up to 75,000 feet (23,000 m), with 100,000 feet (30,000 m) being desirable. Diameter would be 17.25 inches (438 mm) with length and weight being held at a minimum.

Concern was expressed at this time over the use of thermal batteries in the weapon, because all the components needed to produce detonation would be present inside the warhead. An evaluation was therefore made and a report released in April 1955, describing several safing options that could be used. Eventually an automatic safe/arm device was selected, that disconnected the high voltage connections to the detonators. By placing it inside the warhead and not in the warhead adaption kit, it became possible for the system to also short the x-unit capacitor and thermal battery.

By May 1955, the rocket, the AIR-2 Genie, was taking shape. Unguided, the rocket would have a range of 3 to 5 miles (4.8 to 8.0 km) and a velocity of 3,000 feet per second (910 m/s) over its launch speed. Length would be 114 inches (2,900 mm), diameter with fins retracted of 22 inches (560 mm) and with fins extended 34 inches (860 mm). The warhead was pressurized to 15 pounds per square inch (100 kPa) at the factory to prevent high-voltage arc over at altitude.

In June 1955, the air force requested an acceleration of the warhead production program, which would produce an interim warhead for short-term deployment that would be replaced by production Mark 25 warheads as they became available. The interim warheads were to be called the EC-25 (emergency capability warhead), while production warheads were to be called the Mark 25 Mod 0 or W25-0 warhead. Design release was scheduled for July 1956, with the first production warheads being produced in June 1957. Emergency capability warheads were produced beginning in December 1956. Initially, the rocket was certified for the F-86 Sabre, with later capability with the F-101 Voodoo and F-106 Delta Dart as the aircraft became available.

The weapon was hailed as a major achievement as it was believed to be of a new generation of weapons that required little maintenance or inspection — a "wooden" bomb, likened to that of needing the maintenance of a block of pine.

In January 1961, Sandia was requested to develop an environmental safing device for the weapon. This was achieved with an inertial switch, producing the Mark 25 Mod 1 warhead. The weapon entered the stockpile in March 1962.

The W25 was retired in 1984.

=== Atomic demolition munition ===
In October 1953, it was recommended that a lightweight atomic demolition munition (ADM) be developed. The device would be 15 inches (380 mm) in diameter, 30 inches (760 mm) in length, weigh less than 200 pounds (91 kg) and be capable of disassembly into 40-pound (18 kg) packages. The application was cancelled in favor of ADMs based on the Mark 30 and Mark 31 in February 1956.

=== Little John ===
In September 1954, the US army began examining warheads for the MGR-3 Little John rocket (originally called Honest John Junior). Military characteristics for a warhead were provided in April 1955 and the W25 warhead was briefly considered for the role. In February 1956, the application was cancelled in favor of a higher-yield, smaller diameter weapon. The W45 warhead was eventually selected for the rocket.

=== Boosted and all-uranium warhead ===
In June 1956, informal comments were made about the lack of a boosted W25 warhead. Albuquerque Operations Office replied that no formal request for such a weapon had ever been received and the military promptly furnished such a request. In July 1956, a preliminary study was concluded stating that, because of the size limitations of the Genie application, a complete redesign would be needed, effectively producing a new warhead.

That study was followed by concerns about the plutonium hazard of the W25 and queries about producing an all-uranium weapon. A study group was convened which reported in November 1956 that, while the plutonium hazard could be reduced to some degree, inside the space limitations given, an all-uranium warhead was not possible without utilizing a gun-type device. In May 1957, the AEC was directed to examine ways to minimize the plutonium hazard without increasing fissile material requirements. The results of that study remain classified, but the application was cancelled in November 1957.

== Design ==
The W25 was 17.4 inches (44 cm) in diameter and 26.6 inches (68 cm) long, with a reported weight of 218 to 221 pounds (99 to 100 kg). The warhead was an implosion weapon and was of the sealed design.

== See also ==
- List of nuclear weapons
