= T-4 Atomic Demolition Munition =

Tactical nuclear weapon

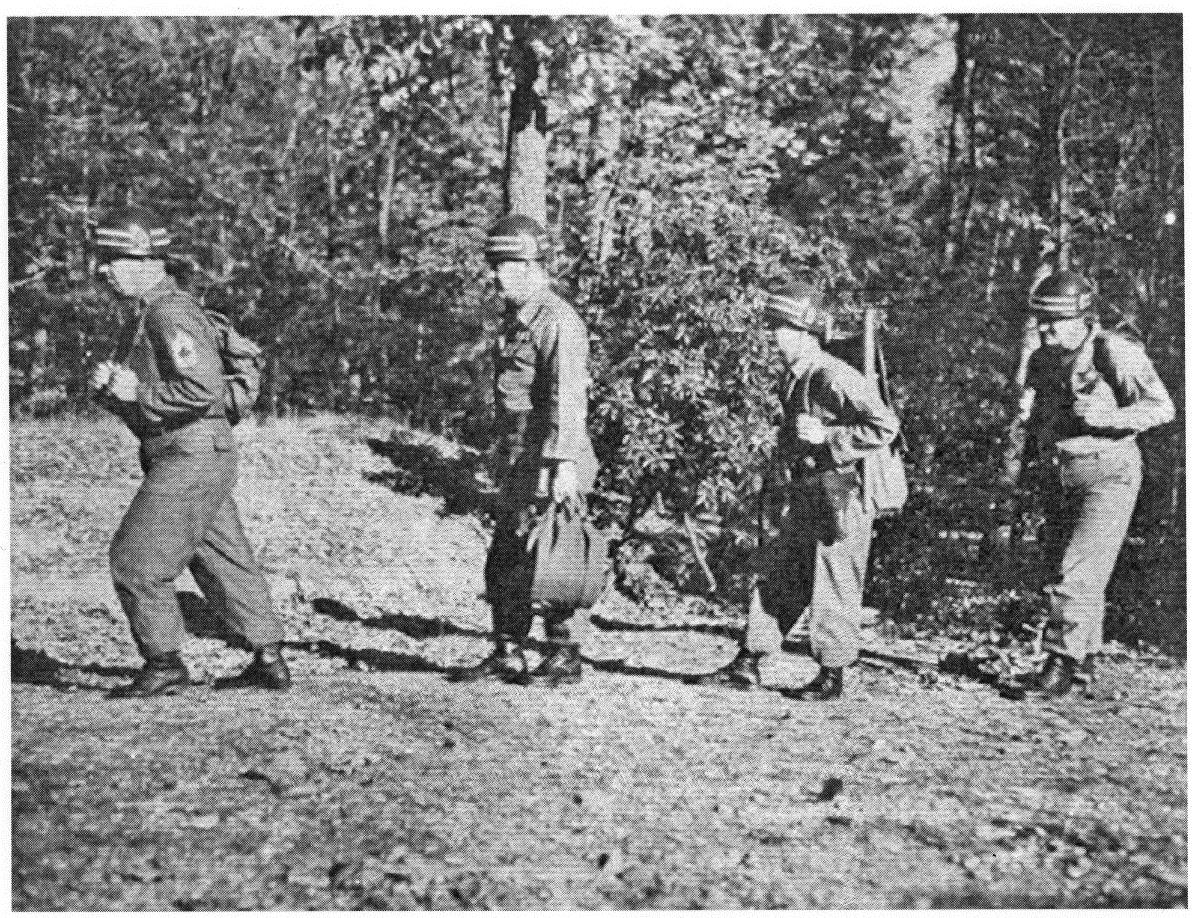
Four soldiers carrying the T4 Atomic Demolition Munition

The T4 Atomic Demolition Munition (ADM) was a nuclear weapon derived from the American W9 nuclear artillery shell.

== History ==
The T4 was produced in 1957 from recycled W9 fissile components and was in service until 1963, when it was replaced with W30 Tactical Atomic Demolition Munitions and W45 Medium Atomic Demolition Munitions.

The weapon weighed 160 pounds (73 kg) and could be broken down into four 40 pounds (18 kg) sections for transport by a four-man crew.

== Media coverage ==
An article in the mid-1990s in Soldier of Fortune magazine by a former US Navy Underwater Demolition Team member described the T4 ADM without naming it. The description was moderately detailed, including that the T4 was assembled from separate components:

- A gun barrel assembly, with the fission “bullet” and propellant and detonator preloaded
- A base assembly, which the gun barrel screwed into, which was normally handled empty
- Three heavy HEU rings, which were added to the base assembly and came in separate carrying cases

These five components would be assembled by first transporting them to the target area, then loading the three uranium rings into the base assembly, then screwing the gun barrel assembly into the base. According to the article, two combination locks with different combinations were then activated by different team members, then the weapon could be armed and the timer set. Each component was reportedly heavy enough that it was a full load for one team member.

Reportedly, a major operational issue with planned usage of the T4 was the poor projected success rate of parachuting five team members into hostile territory at sea with a heavy load, having them all land close together, while being sufficiently uninjured to be able to finish transporting the weapon's components and assemble them. Several practice exercises failed to complete when team members landed too far away or were injured. Future ADM units were single-component and while they might require several people's codes to arm, were a single physical unit which did not need field assembly.

== See also ==
- W54 Special Atomic Demolition Munition
- List of nuclear weapons
