= W74 =

W74 may refer to:

- W74 (nuclear warhead)
- Small rhombidodecahedron
- Toyotomi Station, in Hokkaido, Japan
