= Mark 26 =

Mark 26 or variation, may refer to:

- Mark 26 torpedo
- 3"/70 Mark 26 gun
- Mark 26 nuclear bomb
- Mark 26 missile launcher
- Spitfire Mk26, an Australian homebuilt aircraft modeled after the WWII British Supermarine Spitfire
- MK 26, variant of the Glock 26 adopted by the US military
