= W81 =

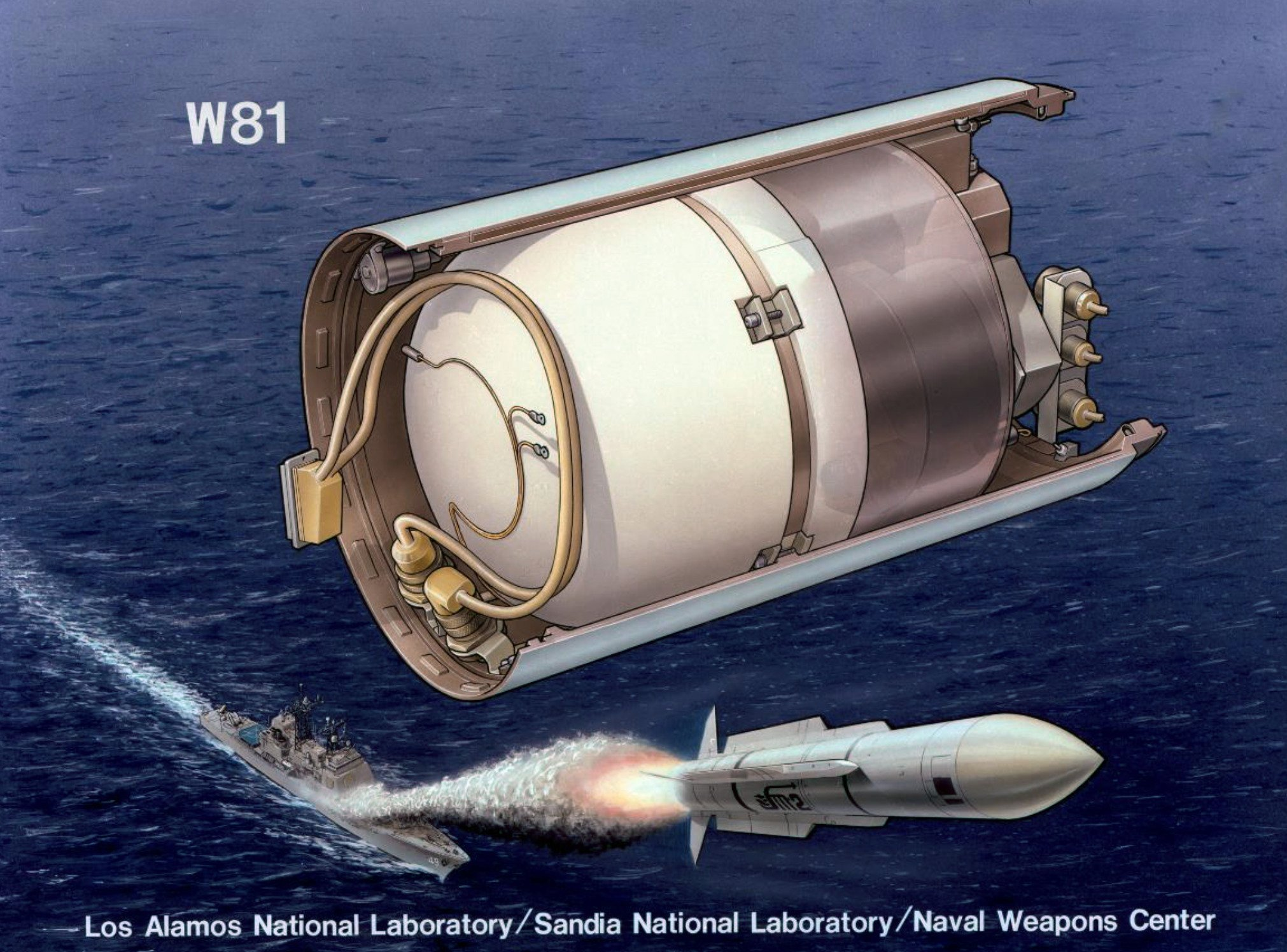
W81 warhead and SM-2 missile

The W81 was a planned American warhead to be mounted on the SM-2 surface-to-air missile used by the United States Navy. The W81 was believed to be derived from the B61 nuclear bomb which forms the backbone of the current US nuclear gravity bomb arsenal and from which the W80 cruise missile warhead is derived. The weapon was being designed at Los Alamos National Laboratory (at the time called Los Alamos Scientific Laboratory).

== Design ==
The W81 went through several design iterations, starting with an enhanced radiation model, then a pure fission model and cancelled in 1986.

Characteristics are not known in detail, but the B61 it is derived from has a physics package (bomb core) of about 12 inches (30 cm) diameter with length of 32 inches (81 cm), weighing around 300 pounds (140 kg) (see the W80, another B61 derived design). Available LASL images show a much shorter weapon, perhaps 12 by 16 to 18 inches (30 by 41 to 46 cm), probably the final fission-only W81 concept, corresponding with the size of the B61 fission primary alone.

The LASL image clearly shows the warhead taking up most, but not all, of the 13.5 inches (34 cm) SM-2 body diameter.

== See also ==
- List of nuclear weapons
- Standard missile
- B61 nuclear bomb
- B61 Family
