= W82 =

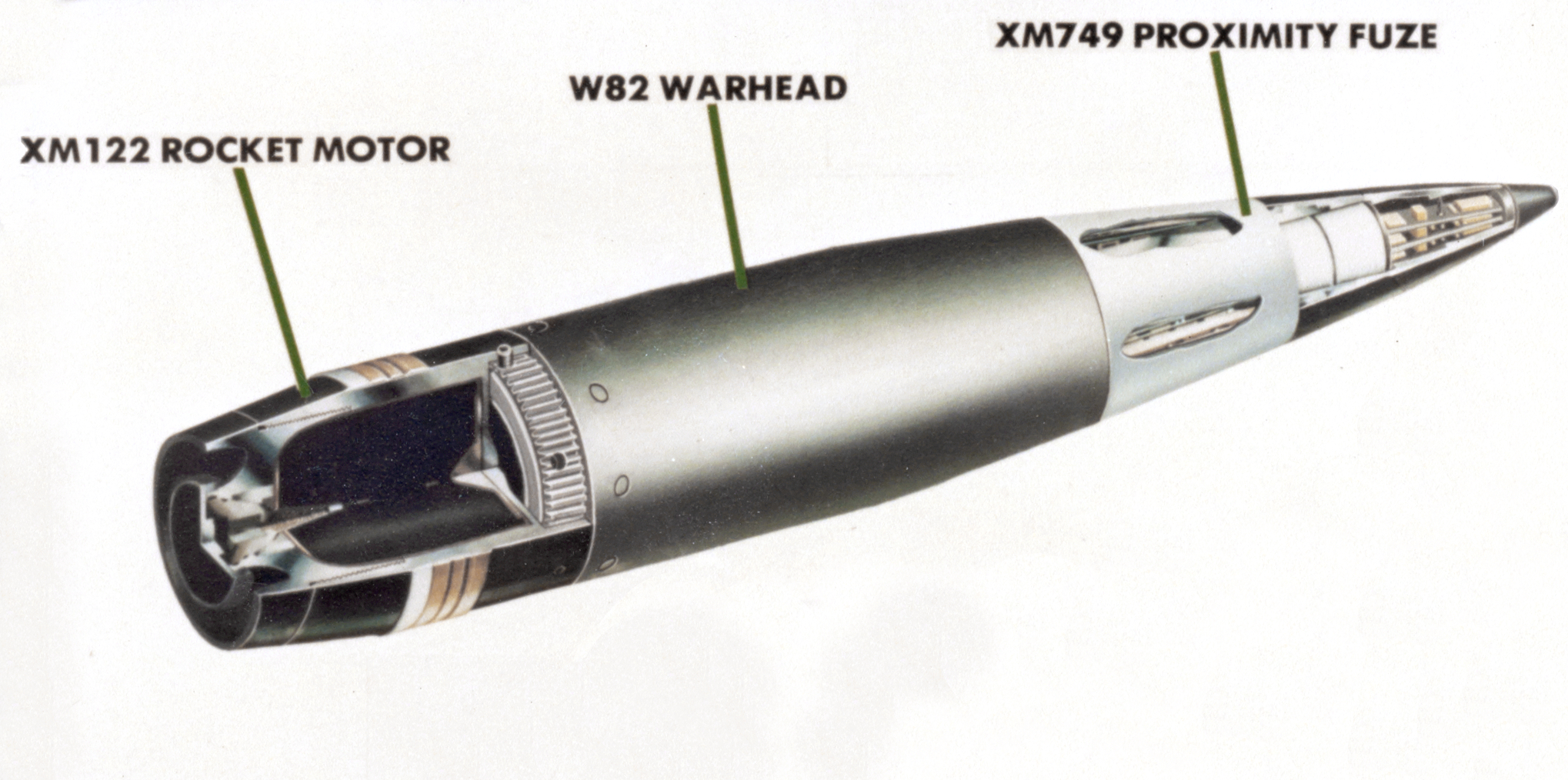
- Diagram of the XM785 shell and W82 warhead.
- Type: Nuclear warhead
- Place of origin: United States

Production history
- Designer: Lawrence Livermore Laboratory

Specifications
- Mass: 43 kg (95 lb)
- Length: 860 mm (34 in)
- Blast yield: 2 kt (8.4 TJ)

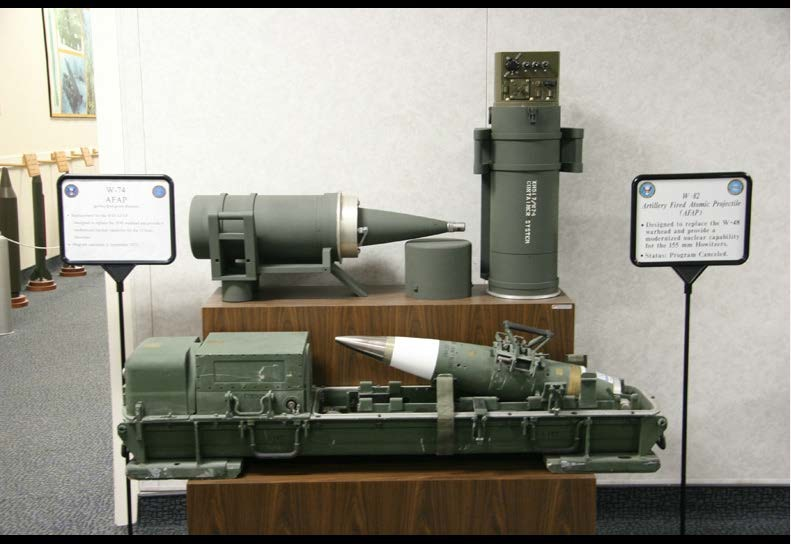
W82 AFAP (bottom)

The W82 (also known as the XM785 shell) was a low-yield tactical nuclear warhead developed by the United States and designed to be used in a 155 mm artillery shell. It was conceived as a more flexible replacement for the W48, the previous generation of 155 mm nuclear artillery shell. A previous attempt to replace the W48 with the W74 munition was canceled due to cost.

Originally envisioned as a dual-purpose weapon, with interchangeable components to allow the shell to function as either a standard fission explosive or an enhanced radiation device, the warhead was developed at Lawrence Livermore Laboratory starting in 1977. The eventual prototype round had a yield of 2 kt (8.4 TJ) in a package 34 inches (860 mm) long and weighing 95 pounds (43 kg), which included the rocket-assisted portion of the shell. The unit cost of the weapon was estimated at US$4 million. Although enhanced radiation devices were considered more effective at blunting an invasion due to the high neutron flux they produce, the more complex design eventually led to the cancellation of the dual-purpose W82-0 program in 1982. Development of a standard weapon, the W82-1, was restarted in 1986. The program was finally cancelled in 1991 due to the end of the Cold War.

== Design ==
The shell used a body made from titanium with a copper rotating band. A special process was developed to bond the rotating band to the titanium body of the shell which prevented shell-band separation during firing.
