= W48 =

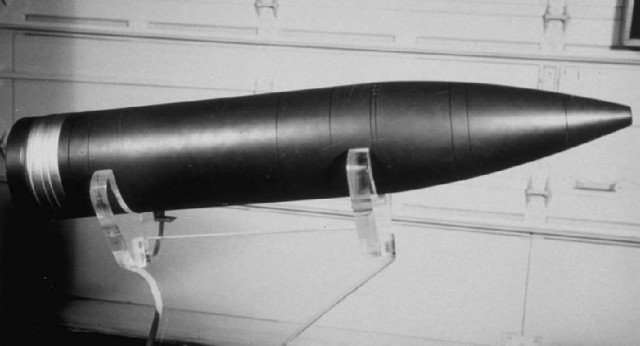
- Type: Nuclear artillery
- Place of origin: United States

Service history
- In service: 1963–1992
- Used by: United States Army

Specifications
- Mass: 120 pounds (54 kg)
- Length: 34 inches (860 mm)
- Diameter: 155 millimetres (6.1 in)
- Effective firing range: 14 kilometres (8.7 mi)
- Blast yield: 100 tonnes of TNT (0.42 TJ)

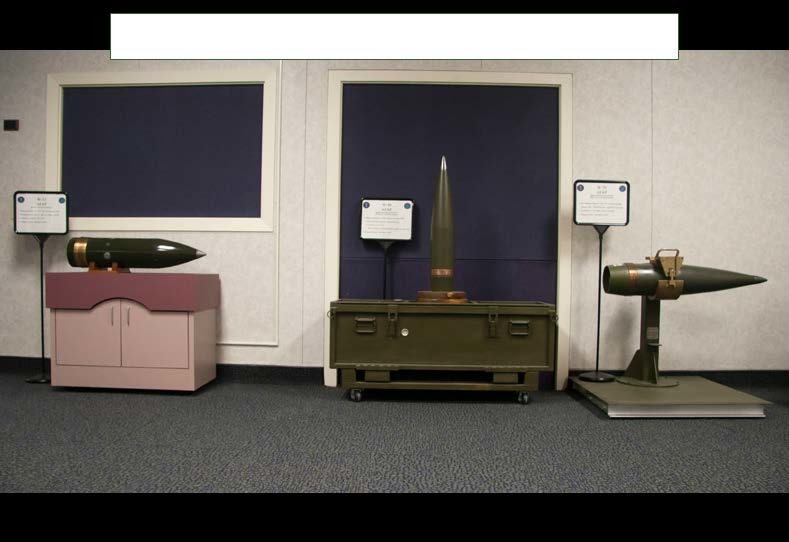
W48 AFAP on display (middle)

The W48 was an American nuclear artillery shell, capable of being fired from any standard 155-millimetre (6.1 in) howitzer. A tactical nuclear weapon, it was manufactured starting in 1963, and all units were retired in 1992. It was known as the XM454 AFAP (artillery fired atomic projectile) in US service.

The weapon was 34 inches (86 cm) long and weighed 120 pounds (54 kg), and was produced in two versions; the Mod 0 and Mod 1. Declassified British document give the yield of the W48 as 100 tonnes of TNT (0.42 TJ), making it one of the smallest nuclear weapons ever developed by the US.

== History ==
The history of the W48 began in April 1954 when the US Army expressed interest in a small low-yield nuclear projectile. The initial development was the W33 8-inch (200 mm) gun-type projectile but the Army was interested in an improved or an even smaller diameter weapon. A study was commissioned to explore the development of a small-diameter implosion type artillery shell. The technology at this time was not sufficiently advanced to develop such a weapon but significant progress was made by the University of California Radiation Laboratory (UCRL) over the next twelve months. A further study of an implosion 8-inch (200 mm) weapon was also commissioned that led to initial work on the XW48 focused on the 8-inch (200 mm) design, leading to the cancellation of the XW32 240-millimetre (9.4 in) shell in favour of the WX48 in May 1955. Although the details of the study are classified, the results were positive enough that by September 1956 that emphasis moved to developing a 155 mm shell.

The draft military characteristics noted that the shell would afford divisional commanders the ability to provide close nuclear fire support and enable the attack of deep targets not appropriately reached by other nuclear weapons available to them. The shell could be fired from sea level to 10,000 feet (3,000 m) to strike targets from sea level to 50,000 feet (15,000 m) in altitude and the weapon would have a range of 15,000 metres (9.3 mi).

In May 1957 Sandia stated that the 155 mm implosion-type projectile would require considerable development work and that the success of the program was not assured. Some of the issues cited included the resistance of beryllium to firing shock and issues with the strength of high-explosives and the nuclear assembly under setback acceleration. New and extremely rugged components would need development and they estimated that at least three years would be required for development.

As the Atomic Energy Commission was not equipped to study setback accelerations on shells, research into this matter was performed by the military. This research determined that the weapon would need to withstand angular accelerations of 166,000 rad/s^{2}, spins of 2,500 to 18,000 revolutions per minute and setback accelerations of 9,000 g (88,000 m/s^{2}). Picatinny Arsenal suggested that the weapon use a toroidal polystyrene capacitor. This capacitor was thought to be the weakest link in the assembly and would have to remain charged for 4 years in storage.

The Army informed Sandia in July 1958 that due to the technical challenges of the 155mm shell that a 175-millimetre (6.9 in) shell be explored as well but that work on the 155 mm design continue. In early 1959 the Army considered cancelling the XW48 but in April decided upon review to continue the program.

In May 1959, Sandia presented the XW48 firing set to the Oak Committee. The design included a ferromagnetic transducer, and formed a cylinder 3.5 inches (89 mm) wide and 1.7 inches (43 mm) high. Tests of the firing set had been successful and most of the design problems had been solved. By August the length of the projectile had increased 2 inches (51 mm) to improve the shell's ballistic characteristics and the weight increased to 120 pounds (54 kg) which reduced the range to 14,000 metres (8.7 mi).

In January 1960 the Defense Atomic Support Agency wrote to Sandia indicating the weapon met the desired military characteristics with some exceptions. These exceptions remain classified except for the statement that a higher yield was still desired. However in May the Military Liaison Committee amended the military Characteristics requirements to make the weapon compatible with the T248 howitzer in addition to the M1A1. UCRL and Sandia stated this was not possible to confirm without further testing. Tests were subsequently performed at Yuma Proving Ground generating angular accelerations of 190,000 radians per second per second and setback accelerations of 12,000 g (120,000 m/s^{2}). No damage to weapon components was detected.

In November 1961 the Army nomenclature of the weapon was changed from T358 to XM454 due to security concerns. In June 1962 the requirement for surface burst preclusion was removed and in September the requirement for the shell to survive air-drop delivery from helicopters was added. At this time full-scale testing of warhead components fired from howitzers began. First production date slipped from June 1962 to October, then to March 1963.

First production of the W48 Mod 0 occurred in October 1963. The maximum range of the weapon was 14,000 metres (8.7 mi) and the minimum fuze-setting range was 1,650 metres (1.03 mi). The final weapon was 34 inches (860 mm) long and weighed 120 pounds (54 kg). The weapon was internally initiated.

Later a Mod 1 variant was produced. Only 135 Mod 0 weapons were produced out of a total production run of 1060 weapons and these weapons were retired by 1969. The Mod 1 weapons were retired in 1992.

== Replacement ==
The W82 was intended to replace the W48 but was cancelled in 1990.

== See also ==
- Nuclear weapon design
- List of nuclear weapons
- Davy Crockett (nuclear device)
