= W52 (nuclear warhead) =

American thermonuclear warhead

The W52 was a thermonuclear warhead developed for the MGM-29 Sergeant short-range ballistic missile used by the United States Army from 1962 to 1977. The W52 was 24 inches (61 cm) in diameter and 57 inches (140 cm) long, and weighed 950 pounds (430 kg). It had a yield of 200 kilotons. A total of 300 W52 warheads were produced.

Researcher Chuck Hansen claims based on his research into the US nuclear program that the thermonuclear W52 and (fission-only) W30 warheads both use a common primary or fission first stage, and that this design was nicknamed the Boa primary.

== Reliability controversy ==
Three models of the W52 were produced, the Mod 1, Mod 2, and Mod 3. A warhead test was performed in 1963, which failed, showing that the Mod 1 and Mod 2 versions of the W52 were essentially duds. The Mod 3 was subsequently redesigned to work properly.

The design failures of the Mod 1 and 2 W52, along with early problems with the W45 and W47 warheads, are still an active part of the debate about the reliability of the US nuclear weapons force moving into the future, without ongoing nuclear testing.

== See also ==
- List of nuclear weapons
