= W84 =

W84 nuclear warhead
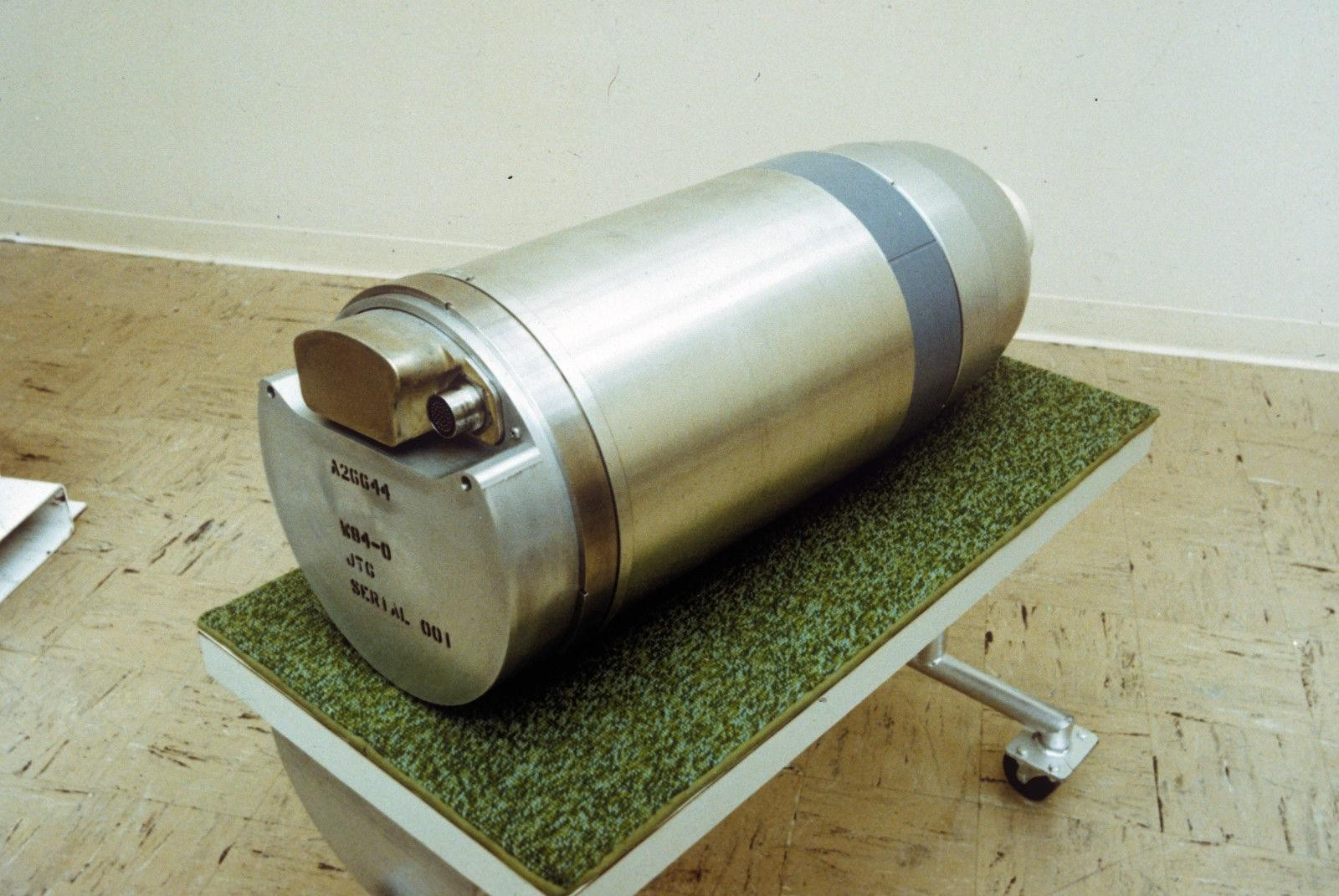
- W84 warhead, serial number 001.
- Type: Nuclear weapon
- Place of origin: United States

Production history
- Designer: Lawrence Livermore National Laboratory
- Designed: September 1978 to June 1983
- Produced: June 1983
- No. built: Disputed; 350 or 530 warheads

Specifications
- Mass: 388 lb (176 kg)
- Length: 34 inches (86 cm)
- Diameter: 13 in (33 cm)
- Blast yield: 0.2 to 150 kilotonnes of TNT (0.84 to 627.60 TJ)

The W84 is an American thermonuclear warhead initially designed for use on the BGM-109G Gryphon Ground Launched Cruise Missile (GLCM).

== History ==
The weapon was designed by Lawrence Livermore National Laboratory beginning in September 1978 for the Ground Launched Cruise Missile program. Production engineering began in December 1980 and first production began in June 1983 with full-scale production starting in September 1983. Though the exact number is disputed, either 350 or 530 warheads were produced.

The warhead suffered post-deployment design issues after the weapon produced an unexpectedly low yield in a simulated ageing test. This issue was corrected without redesign of the nuclear explosive sub-assembly. One test of the weapon was 2 August 1984 shot Fusileer Correo at a depth of 1,099 feet (335 m), producing a yield of less than 20 kilotonnes of TNT (84 TJ).

With the signing of the Intermediate-Range Nuclear Forces Treaty (INF Treaty) in 1987, the GLCMs that carried the W84 were destroyed and the warheads put into the inactive reserve stockpile. These warheads have been used to study the effects of long-term ageing on TATB and polymer-bonded explosives.

The W84 was briefly considered alongside the B61 Mod 12 for the Long-Ranged Stand Off Missile (LRSO) program, but a new modification of the W80, the W80 Mod 4 was chosen instead as neither system met the dimension and weight requirements for the program.

== Design ==
The W84 is a derivative of the B61 nuclear bomb design and is a close relative of the W80 warhead used on the AGM-86 ALCM, AGM-129 ACM, and BGM-109 Tomahawk SLCM cruise missiles. It is a two-stage radiation implosion warhead with a variable yield ranging from 0.2 kiloton up to 150 kilotons. The W84 was designed at Lawrence Livermore National Laboratory while the B61 nuclear bomb the design is thought to be based on originated at Los Alamos National Laboratory.

The warhead is 13 inches (33 cm) in diameter and 34 inches (86 cm) long which is slightly wider and longer than the W80 warhead used on other cruise missiles from this era. It weighs 388 pounds (176 kg), almost 100 pounds (45 kg) pounds heavier than the W80. The warhead contains TATB-based LX-17 polymer bonded explosive in its primary stage, which is an insensitive high-explosive (IHE) designed to reduce the chance of detonation in an accident. Other explosive present in the warhead include ultra-fine powdered TATB (UF-TATB) and LX-16, a PETN-based conventional polymer-bonded high explosive.

The W84 has all eight of the modern types of nuclear weapon safety features identified as desirable in nuclear weapon safety studies. It is the only US nuclear warhead which has all eight features. These include: insensitive high-explosives, a fire resistant pit, Enhanced Nuclear Detonation Safety (ENDS/EEI) with detonator stronglinks, Command Disable, and the most advanced Cat G Permissive Action Link (PAL).

A 2001 declassified report states that the W84 does not use a Canned Subassembly (CSA) and that the weapon's secondary stage is not sealed.

== Gallery ==
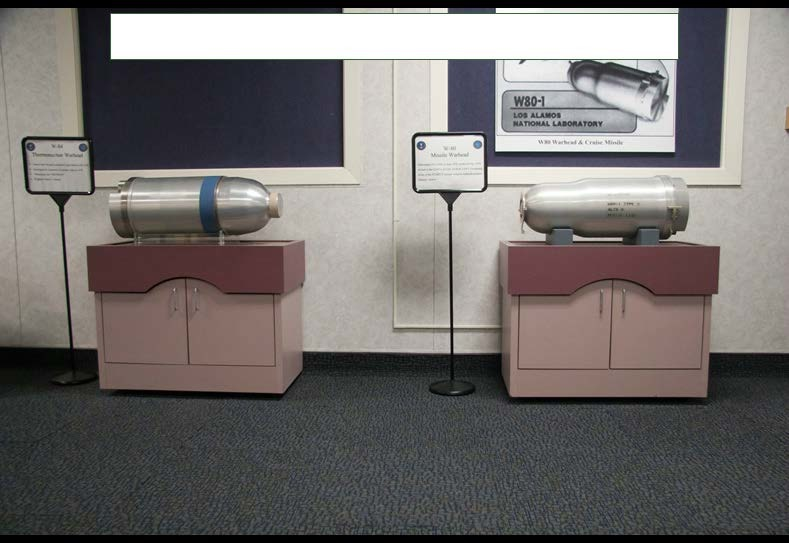
W84 warhead (left) on display at the Nuclear Weapons Instructional Museum

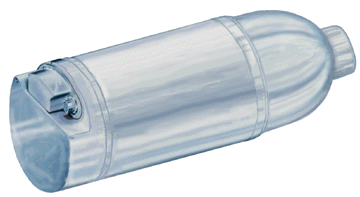
A LLNL drawing of the W84

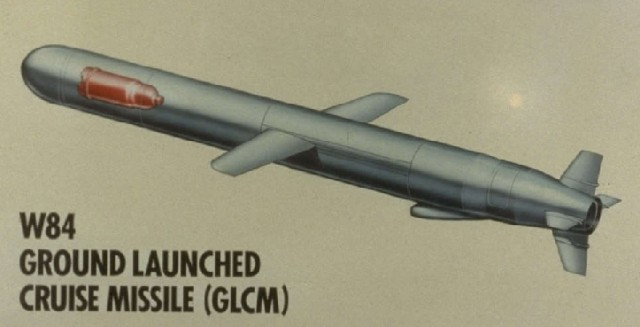
The GLCM missile showing the W84 location (LLNL drawing)

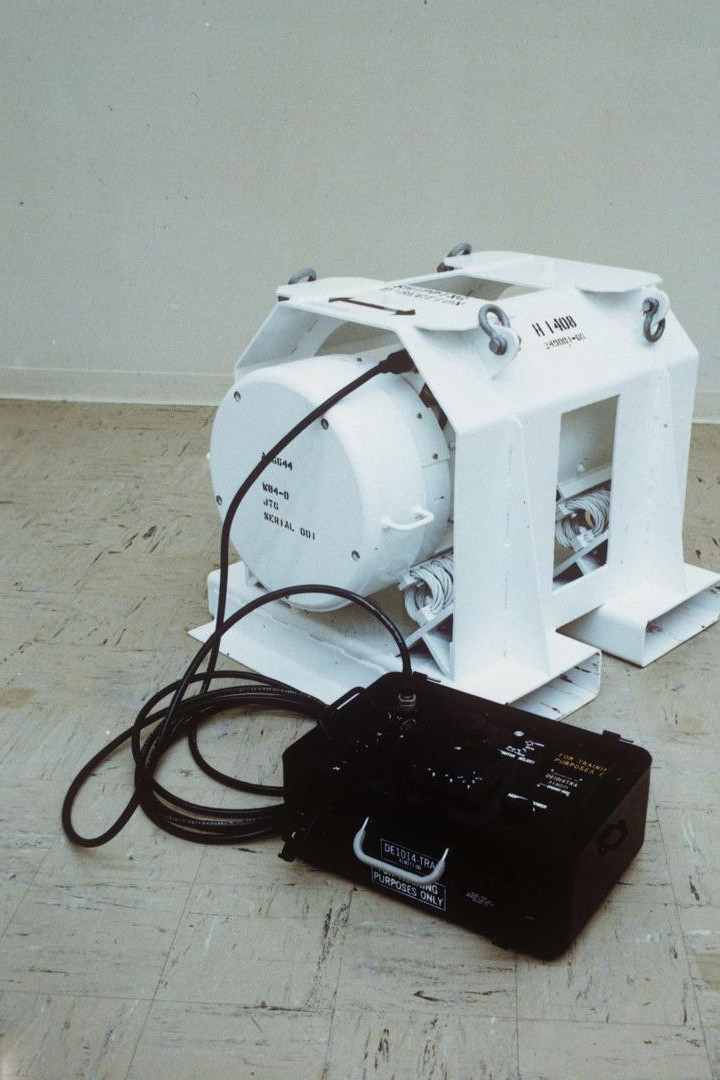
Storage container and PAL coder-decoder for the W84 warhead.

== See also ==
- B61 Family
- List of nuclear weapons
