= AIR-2 Genie =

American nuclear air-to-air rocket

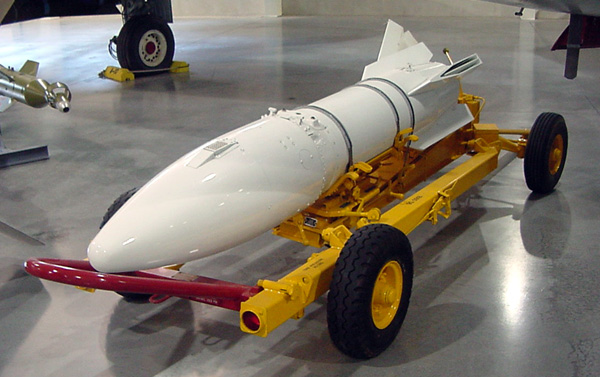
- AIR-2A Genie nuclear air-to-air rocket on an MF-9 Transport Trailer at Hill Aerospace Museum
- Type: Short-range air-to-air rocket
- Place of origin: United States

Service history
- In service: 1958–1985

Production history
- Manufacturer: Douglas Aircraft Company
- Produced: 1957–1962

Specifications
- Mass: 822 pounds (372.9 kg)
- Length: 9 feet 8 inches (2.95 m)
- Diameter: 17.5 in (444.5 mm)
- Wingspan: 3 ft .4 in (0.9 m)
- Warhead: 1.5 kT nuclear
- Engine: Thiokol SR49
- Propellant: Solid fuel
- Operational range: 6 miles (9.7 km)
- Maximum speed: Mach 3.3

The Douglas AIR-2 Genie (previous designation MB-1) was an unguided air-to-air rocket with a 1.5 kt W25 nuclear warhead. It was deployed by the United States Air Force (USAF 1957–1985) and Canada (Royal Canadian Air Force 1965–1968, Air Command 1968–1984) during the Cold War. Production ended in 1962 after over 3,000 were made, with some related training and test derivatives being produced later.

== Development ==
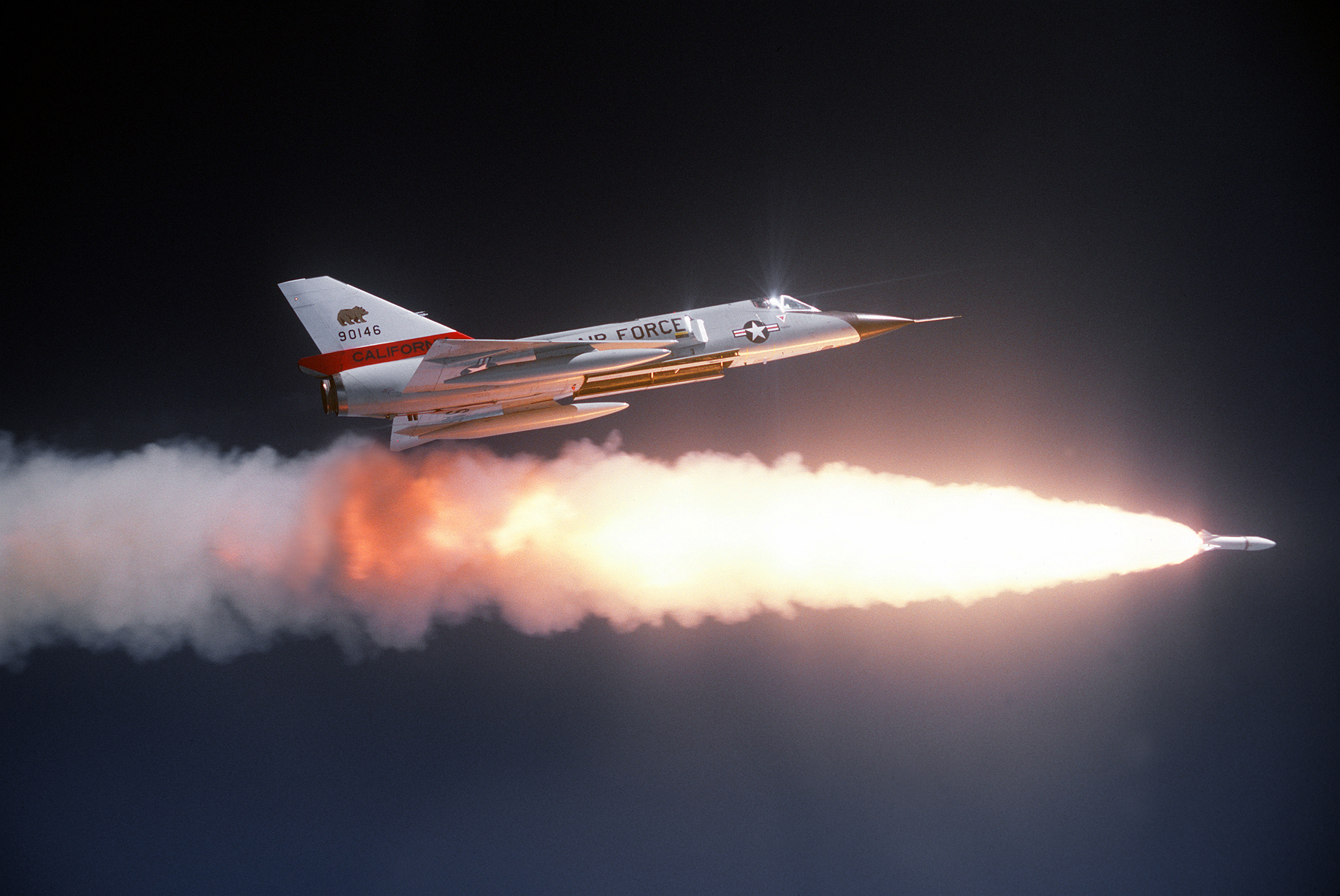
A Convair F-106 of the California Air National Guard fires an inert version of the Genie

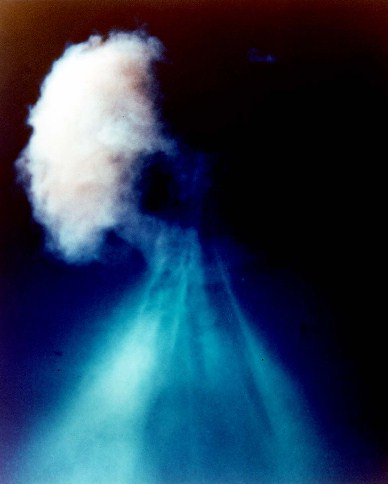
Plumbbob John nuclear test, the only live test of a Genie rocket, on 19 July 1957. Fired from a US Air Force F-89J over Yucca Flats, Nevada Test Site at an altitude of ~15,000 ft (4.5 km).

The interception of Soviet strategic bombers was a major military preoccupation of the late 1940s and 1950s. The revelation in 1947 that the Soviet Union had produced a reverse-engineered copy of the Boeing B-29 Superfortress, the Tupolev Tu-4 (NATO reporting name "Bull"), which could reach the continental United States in a one-way attack, followed by the Soviets developing their own atomic bomb in 1949, produced considerable anxiety.

The World War II-age fighter armament of machine guns and cannon were inadequate to stop attacks by massed formations of high-speed bombers. Firing large volleys of unguided rockets into bomber formations was not much better, and true air-to-air missiles were in their infancy. In 1954 Douglas Aircraft began a program to investigate the possibility of a nuclear-armed air-to-air weapon. To ensure simplicity and reliability, the weapon would be unguided, since the large blast radius made precise accuracy unnecessary.

The then top-secret project had various code names, such as Bird Dog, Ding Dong, and High Card. Full-scale development began in 1955, with test firing of inert warhead rockets commencing in early 1956. The final design carried a 1.5-kiloton W25 nuclear warhead and was powered by a Thiokol SR49-TC-1 solid-fuel rocket engine of 162 kN (36,000 lb_{f}) thrust, sufficient to accelerate the rocket to Mach 3.3 during its two-second burn. Total flight time was about 12 seconds, during which time the rocket covered 10 km (6.2 mi). Targeting, arming, and firing of the weapon were coordinated by the launch aircraft's fire-control system. Detonation was by time-delay fuze, although the fuzing mechanism would not arm the warhead until engine burn-out, to give the launch aircraft sufficient time to turn and escape. However, there was no mechanism for disarming the warhead after launch. Lethal radius of the blast was estimated to be about 300 metres (980 ft). Once fired, the Genie's short flight-time and large blast radius made it virtually impossible for a bomber to avoid destruction.

The new rocket entered service with the designation MB-1 Genie in 1957. The first interceptor squadrons to carry the MB-1 declared initial operational capability on 1 January 1957, when a handful of rockets and 15 F-89 interceptors capable of carrying them were deployed at Wurtsmith Air Force Base in northern Michigan and Hamilton Air Force Base outside San Francisco. By the next year, 268 F-89s had received the necessary wing pylon and fire-control system modifications to carry the weapon. While officially known as the MB-1 Genie, the rocket was often nicknamed "Ding-Dong" by crews and pilots. About 3,150 Genie rockets were produced before production ended in 1963. In 1962 the weapon was redesignated AIR-2A Genie. Many rounds were upgraded with improved, longer-duration rocket motors; the upgraded weapons sometimes known (apparently only semi-officially) as AIR-2B. An inert training round, originally MB-1-T and later ATR-2A, was also produced in small numbers – the training version was known to Canadian crews as the "dum-dum".

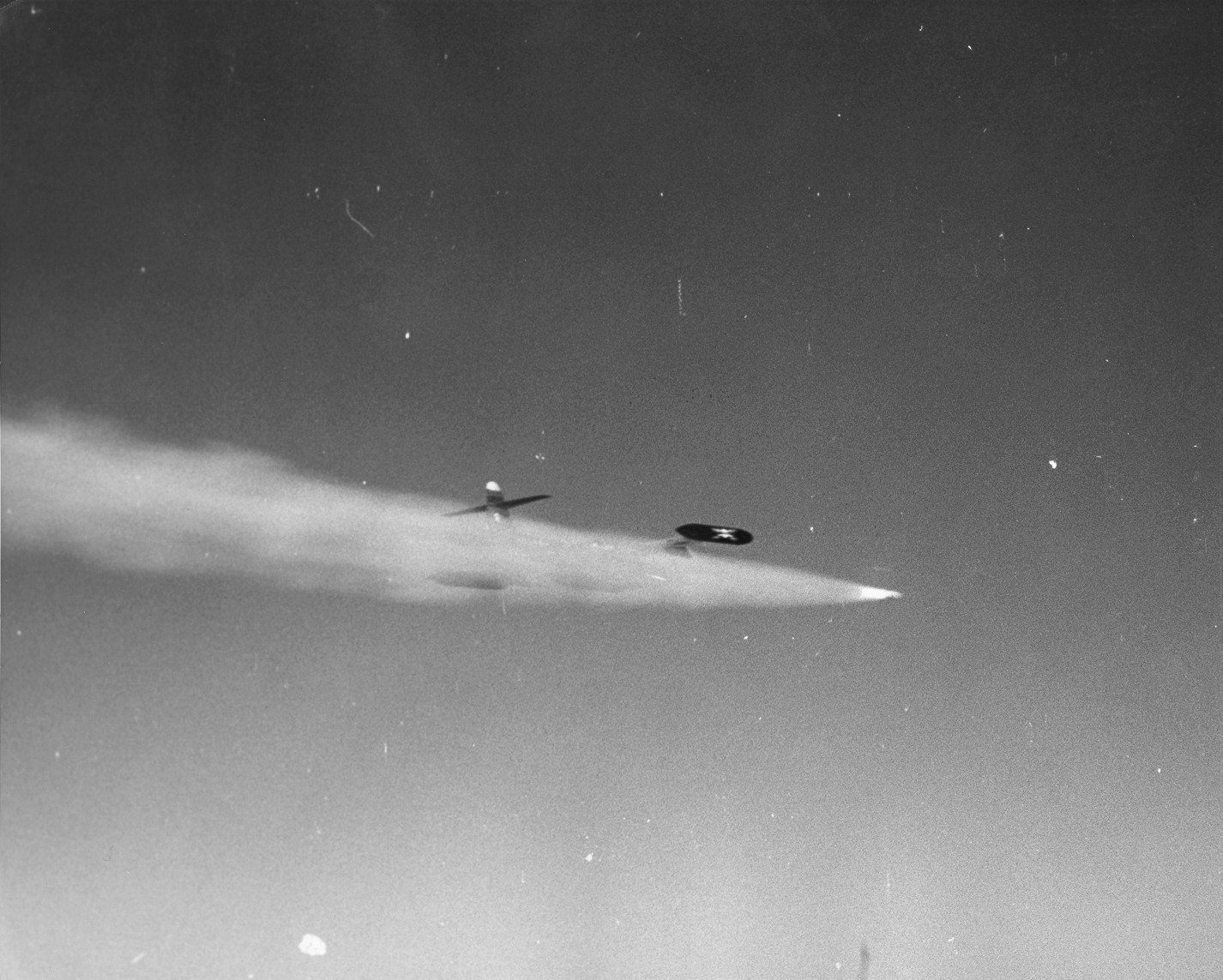
An F-89 Scorpion firing the live Genie used in the Plumbbob John test

A live Genie was detonated only once, in Operation Plumbbob on 19 July 1957. It was fired by USAF Captain Eric William Hutchison (pilot) and USAF Captain Alfred C. Barbee (radar operator) flying an F-89J over Yucca Flats. Sources vary as to the height of the blast, but it was between 18,500 and 20,000 ft (5,600 and 6,100 m) above mean sea level. A group of five USAF officers volunteered to stand uncovered in their light summer uniforms underneath the blast to prove that the weapon was safe for use over populated areas. They were photographed by Department of Defense photographer George Yoshitake who stood there with them. Gamma and neutron doses received by observers on the ground were negligible. Doses received by aircrew were highest for the fliers assigned to penetrate the airburst cloud ten minutes after explosion.

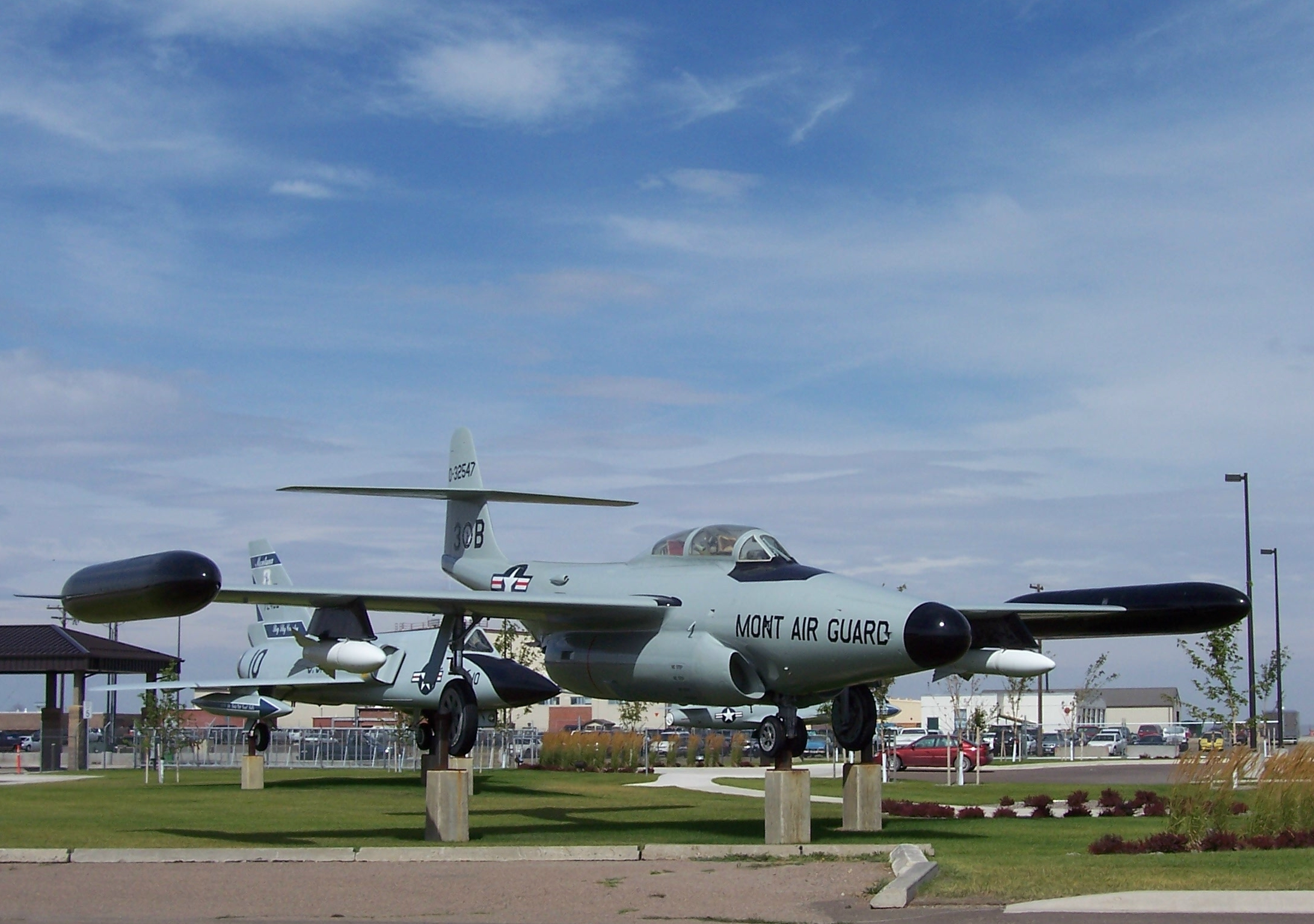
The Montana Air National Guard F-89J that launched the live Genie.

While in service with the U.S. Air Force, the Genie was carried operationally on the F-89 Scorpion, F-101B Voodoo, and the F-106 Delta Dart. While the Genie was originally intended to be carried by the F-104 Starfighter using a unique 'trapeze' launching rail, the project never proceeded beyond the testing phase. Convair offered an upgrade of the F-102 Delta Dagger that would have been Genie-capable, but it too was not adopted. Operational use of the Genie was discontinued in 1988 with the retirement of the F-106 interceptor.

The only other Genie user was Canada, whose CF-101 Voodoos carried Genies until 1984 via a dual-key arrangement where the missiles were kept under United States custody, and released to Canada under circumstances requiring their use. The RAF briefly considered the missile for use on the English Electric Lightning.

Safety features included final arming by detecting the acceleration and deceleration of a fast aircraft at high altitude. The weapon was built too early to use a permissive action link security device.

The F-89J that was used to launch the only live test is on static display at the Montana Air National Guard in Great Falls, Montana.

== Operators ==
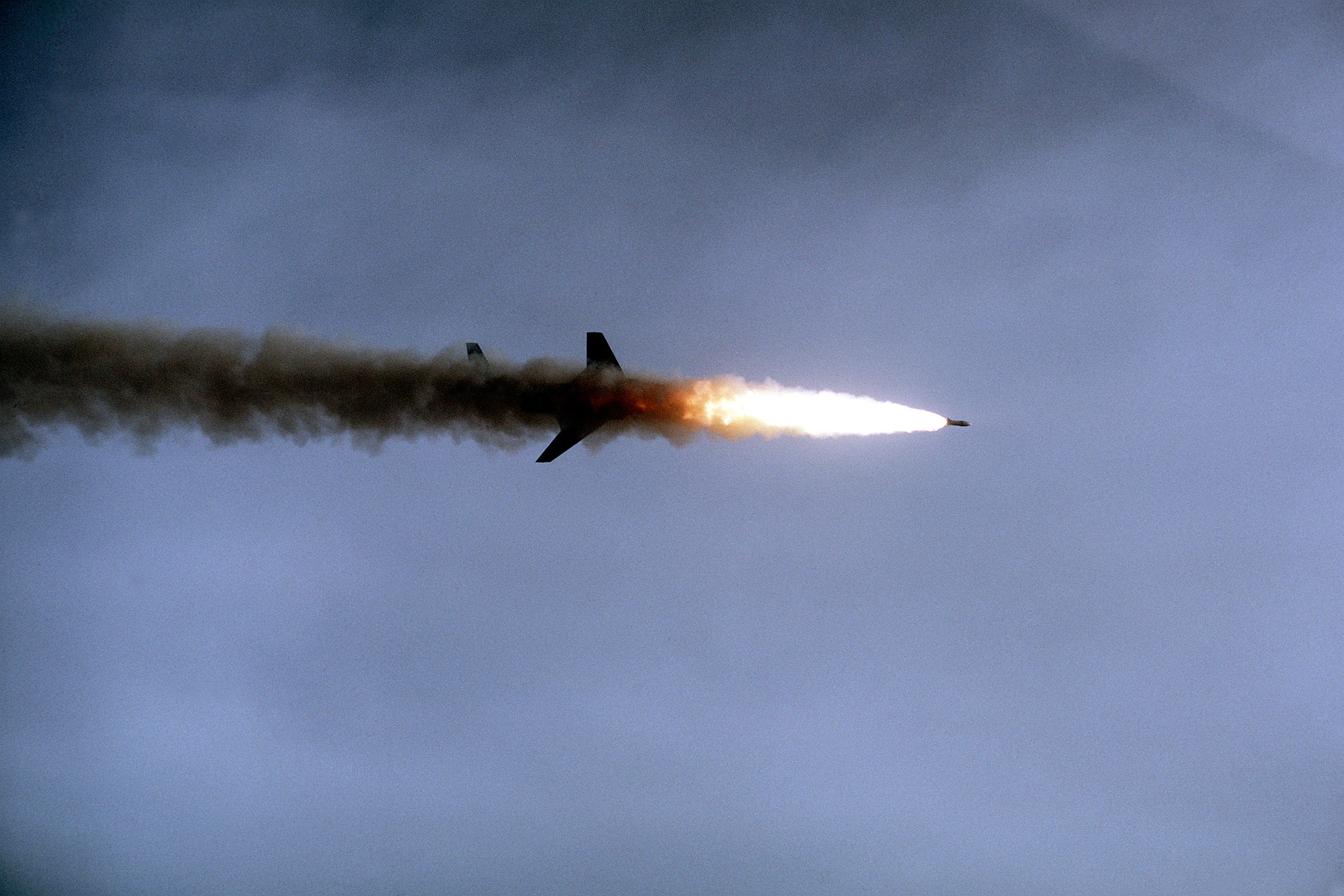
CF-101B of the Canadian Forces firing a Genie in 1982

Canada

- Royal Canadian Air Force/Canadian Forces Air Command

United States

- United States Air Force

== Surviving examples ==
Below is a list of museums which have a Genie rocket in their collection:

- Air Force Armament Museum, Eglin Air Force Base, Florida
- Atlantic Canada Aviation Museum, Halifax, Nova Scotia
- Hill Aerospace Museum, Ogden, Utah
- MAPS Air Museum, Akron-Canton Regional Airport, Ohio ATR-2 with MF-9 trailer
- Museum of Aviation at Robins Air Force Base, Georgia ATR-2N with MF-9 trailer
- National Museum of the United States Air Force, Wright-Patterson Air Force Base, Ohio
- Oregon Military Museum at Camp Withycombe, Clackamas, Oregon
- Peterson Air and Space Museum, Colorado Springs, Colorado
- Pima Air & Space Museum, Tucson, Arizona Inert round with trailer
- Selfridge Air National Guard Base Museum, Harrison Township, Michigan
- Western Canada Aviation Museum, Winnipeg, Manitoba, Canada
- Ellsworth Air and Space Museum at Ellsworth Air Force Base, Rapid City, South Dakota
- Air Defence Museum, CFB Bagotville, 3 Wing, Saguenay, Quebec, Canada
- Comox Air Force Museum, CFB Comox, 19 Wing, Comox, British Columbia, British Columbia, Canada
- Vermont National Guard Library and Museum, Camp Johnson, Colchester, Vermont
- Jimmy Doolittle Air & Space Museum, Travis Air Force Base, California
- National Atomic Testing Museum, Paradise, Nevada
- Malmstrom Air Force Base Museum, Great Falls, Montana
- National Museum of Nuclear Science & History, Albuquerque, New Mexico

On 31 January 2024 a dilapidated air-to-air missile, later identified as an inert AIR-2 Genie, was reported to police in the city of Bellevue, Washington after being offered as a donation to the National Museum of the U.S. Air Force in Dayton, Ohio.

== See also ==
- How to Photograph an Atomic Bomb
- List of nuclear weapons
- AIM-26 Falcon
