= W30 (nuclear warhead) =

American nuclear warhead

The W30 was an American nuclear warhead used on the RIM-8 Talos surface-to-air missile and the Tactical Atomic Demolition Munition (TADM).

The W30 was 22 inches (56 cm) in diameter and 48 inches (120 cm) long, weighing 438, 450, or 490 pounds (199, 204, or 222 kg) depending on the version.

The Talos missile variants were produced from 1959 to 1965, and used until 1979. A total of 300 were produced as missile warheads. The W30 Mod 1, 2, and 3 for Talos all had yields of 5 (sometimes more precisely reported as 4.7) kilotons.

The TADM warhead was produced from 1961 and saw service until 1966. There were two variants, the W30 Mod 4 Y1 with 0.3 kiloton yield (300 tons TNT) and the W30 Mod 4 Y2 with 0.5 kiloton (500 tons TNT) yield. 300 TADM W30s were produced, between the two versions.

A yield of 19 kilotons is given in some references for an unspecified version, possibly a not-deployed high yield test only unit.

The W30 is stated by nuclear researcher Chuck Hansen to have been one of two weapons using a common fission bomb core design, the Boa primary; the other weapon using the Boa is claimed to have been the 200 kiloton W52 thermonuclear warhead.

The W30 and W31 warheads used simple 3-digit lockout controls on their arming components, and could not be made safe by environmental sensing devices due to their use profile. Other warheads could use sensors to detect whether they had actually been through re-entry or sudden deceleration, prior to arming the weapon.

== See also ==
- List of nuclear weapons
