= W38 =

W38 may refer to:

- W38 (nuclear warhead)
- Ngarluma language
- Wassamu Station, in Hokkaido Japan
