= RDS-9 =

Soviet nuclear bomb first tested in 1954

The RDS-9 (Russian: РДС-9) was part of a string of Nuclear weapon testing by the Soviet Union. It was tested on October 19, 1954. This test was the first failure in the RDS series of tests. It was developed originally for the T-5 torpedo. The weapon was modified and retested in 1955.
