= Chuck Hansen =

American compiler of unclassified documents on nuclear weapons

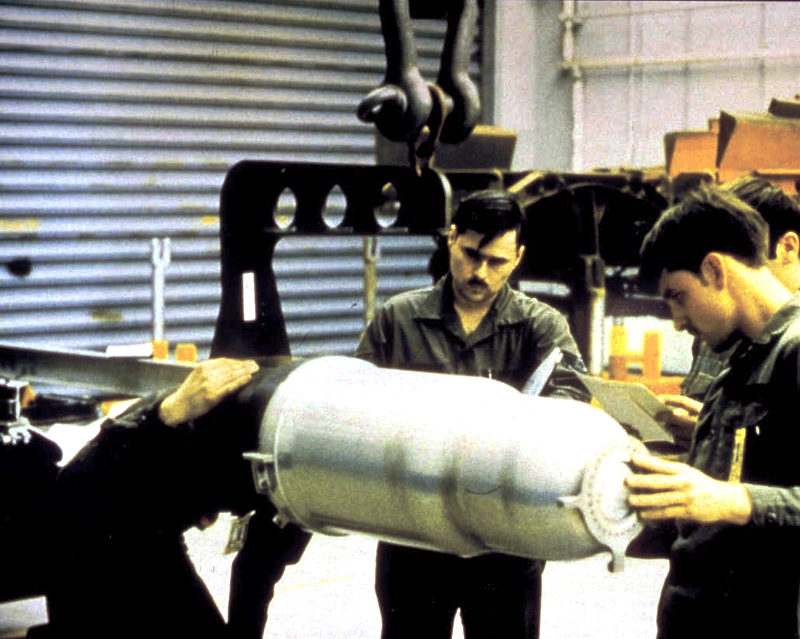
W80 thermonuclear warhead, photo published in Hansen's The Swords of Armageddon

Chuck Hansen (May 13, 1947 – March 26, 2003) was the compiler, over a period of 30 years, of the world's largest private collection of unclassified documents on how America developed atomic and thermonuclear weapons.

== Research ==
Hansen's documents were obtained through the U.S. Freedom of Information Act. Since his death, they have been housed at the National Security Archive at George Washington University.

In 1988, Hansen wrote the book U.S. Nuclear Weapons: The Secret History, which, along with great detail about the process of developing, testing and administering atomic weapons, was critical of the U.S. Defense Department, the Atomic Energy Commission, and some other government agencies. In the book, Hansen reported that the early years of nuclear testing were less successful than claimed; bombs failed, or yielded smaller or larger explosions than anticipated or announced, and attempts to develop a radioactivity-free bomb were unsuccessful. U.S. Nuclear Weapons: The Secret History is currently out of print, but it is available on compact disk through his publisher.

A second compilation of Hansen's material was published on compact disc as Swords of Armageddon in 1995. While Hansen's U.S. Nuclear Weapons: The Secret History was very instructive, Swords of Armageddon contains much more information and details about nuclear weapons developed by the United States. It is in its second revision.

== Publications ==
- — (20 March 1988). U.S. Nuclear Weapons: The Secret History (1st ed.). Crown. ISBN 978-0517567401. LCCN 87021995. OCLC 865554459. OL 2392513M – via Internet Archive.
- — (2007). The Swords of Armageddon: U.S. Nuclear Weapons Development Since 1945 (PDF) (CD-ROM & download available) (2nd ed.). Sunnyvale, California: Chukelea Publications. ISBN 978-0979191503. OCLC 231585284.

== See also ==
- List of books about nuclear issues
- List of nuclear whistleblowers
- Nuclear disarmament
- Nuclear weapons and the United States
- Nevada Test Site
- Alvin C. Graves
- National Security Archive
