= Atomic demolition munition =

Nuclear land mines

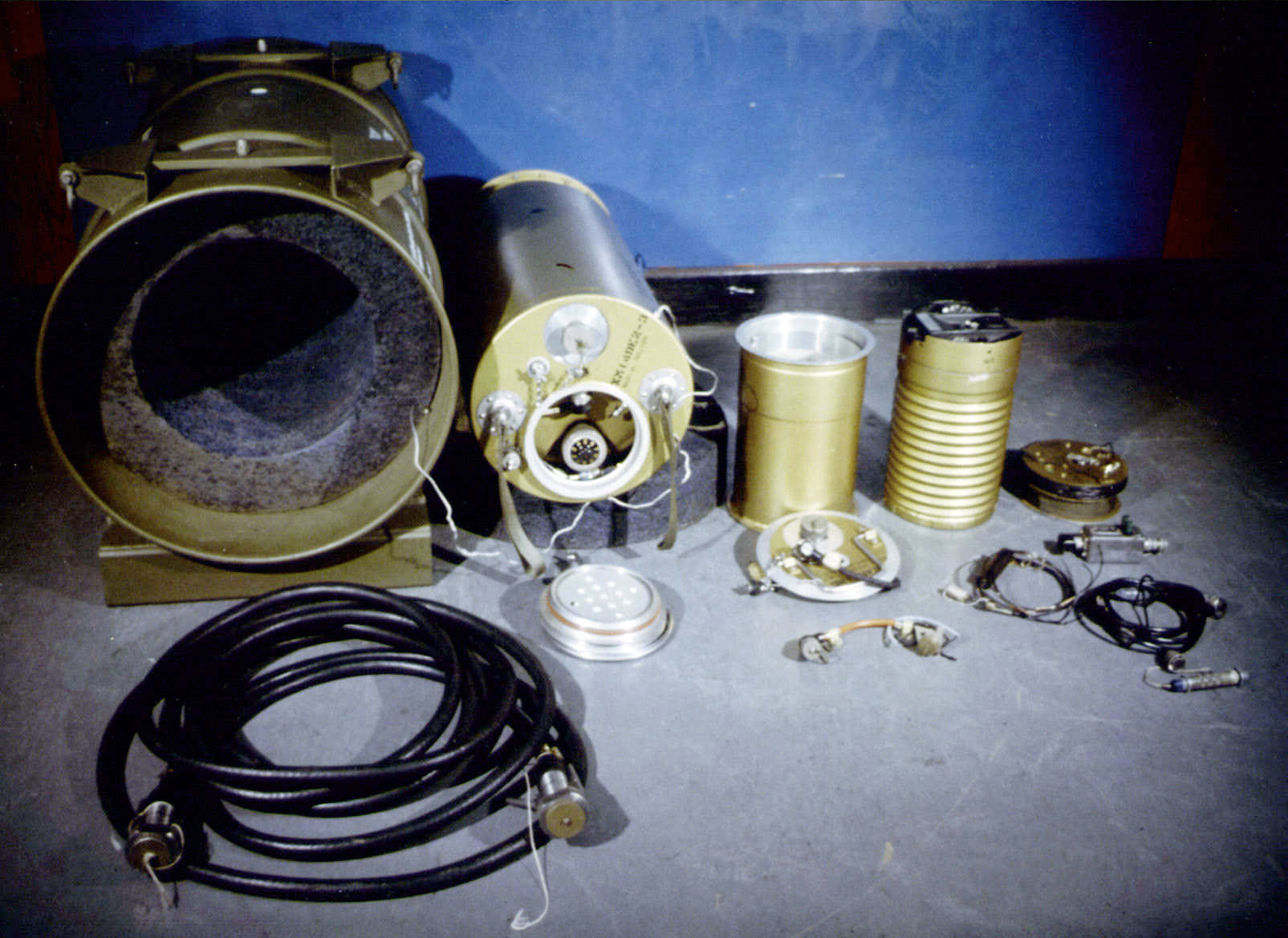
Internal components of the MADM setup. From left to right: packing container, W45 warhead, code-decoder unit, firing unit.

Atomic demolition munitions (ADMs), colloquially known as nuclear land mines, are small nuclear explosive devices. ADMs were developed for both military and civilian purposes. As weapons, they were designed to be exploded in the forward battle area, in order to block or channel enemy forces. Non-militarily, they were designed for demolition, mining or earthmoving. Apart from testing, however, they have never been used for either purpose.

== Military uses ==
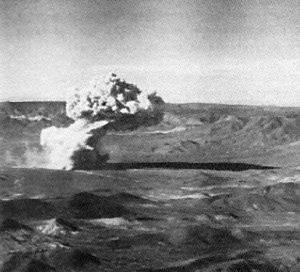
Shot Uncle of Operation Buster-Jangle, had a yield of 1.2 kilotons, and was detonated 5.2 m (17 ft) beneath ground level. The yield is approximately the same as the maximum yield of the W54 equipped SADM. The explosion resulted in a cloud that rose to 11,500 ft, and deposited fallout to the north and north-northeast. The resulting crater was 260 feet wide and 53 feet deep.

Instead of being delivered to the target by missiles, rockets, or artillery shells, ADMs were intended to be emplaced by soldiers. Due to their relatively small size and light weight, ADMs could be emplaced by military engineers or special forces teams, then detonated on command or by timer to create massive obstructions. By destroying key terrain features or choke points such as bridges, dams, mountain passes and tunnels, ADMs could serve to create physical as well as radiological obstacles to the movement of enemy forces and thus channel them into prepared killing zones.

According to official accounts, the United States deployed ADMs overseas in Italy and West Germany (Fulda Gap) during the Cold War. The most modern types (SADM and MADM) were deployed in South Korea. Seymour Hersh referred to the deployment of ADMs along the Golan Heights by Israel in the early 1980s.

== Civilian uses ==
ADMs have never been used commercially although similar small devices, often modified to cut down on fission yield and maximize fusion, have been deeply buried to put out gas well fires as part of the Soviet test program.

The Soviet Union tested the use of nuclear devices for mining and natural gas extraction (stimulating gas flow in a similar manner to fracking) on several occasions starting in the mid-1960s, as part of the Nuclear Explosions for the National Economy program. Tests for similar purposes were carried out in the United States under Operation Plowshare, but due to radioactive contamination caused by the tests, no direct commercial use was made of the technology although they were successful at nucleosynthesis and probing the composition of the Earth's deep crust by Vibroseis, which has helped mining company prospecting.

== United States ADMs ==
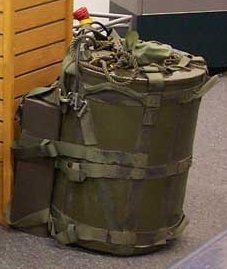
H-912 transport container for Mk-54 SADM

In the 1950s and 1960s, the United States developed several different types of lightweight nuclear devices. The main one was the W54, a cylinder 40 by 60 cm (about 16 by 24 inches) that weighed 23 kg (50 lb). It was fired by a mechanical timer and had a variable yield equivalent to between 10 tons and 1 kt of TNT. A field non-variable yield version of the W54 nuclear device (called the "Mk-54 Davy Crockett" warhead for the M-388 Crockett round) was used in the Davy Crockett Weapon System.

- W7/ADM-B (c. 1954–67)
- T4 ADM (1957–63) gun type
- W30/Tactical Atomic Demolition Munition (1961–66)
- W31/ADM (1960–65)
- W45/Medium Atomic Demolition Munition (1964–84)
- W54/Special Atomic Demolition Munition (1965–89)

=== TADM ===
External videos
- A training film on the deployment and use of the TADM
- https://www.youtube.com/watch?v=ffRKPsIMOss

The Mk 30 Mod 1 Tactical Atomic Demolition Munition (TADM) was a portable atomic bomb, consisting of a Mk 30 warhead installed in a XM-113 case. The XM-113 was 26 inches (660 mm) in diameter and 70 inches (1,800 mm) long, and looked like corrugated culvert pipe. The whole system weighed 840 pounds (380 kg). Production of the TADM started in 1961 and all were removed from stockpile by 1966. A weapons effect test of the TADM was made in the 1962 Johnny Boy ("Johnnie Boy") shot of the Dominic II series (which is more accurately referred to as Operation Sunbeam), the yield of Johnny Boy/Johnnie Boy was about 0.5 kt. A preceding ADM test that resulted in a comparable yield, was test shot "Danny Boy" of Operation Nougat, also producing a yield of about 0.5 kiloton.

=== SADM ===
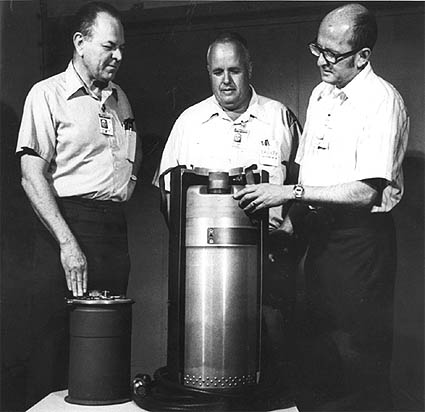
Scientists look at a MADM nuclear land mine. Cutaway casing with warhead inside, code-decoder / firing unit is at left.

The Special Atomic Demolition Munition (SADM) was a family of man-portable nuclear weapons based on the B54/W54 SADM fielded by the US military, but never used in actual combat. The US Army planned to use the weapons in Europe in the event of a Soviet invasion. US Army Engineers would use the weapon to irradiate, destroy, and deny key routes of communication through limited terrain such as the Fulda Gap. Green Light teams were trained to parachute into Soviet occupied western Europe with the SADM and destroy power plants, bridges, and dams. Yields were selectable from two options of 0.1 or 0.2 kilotons.

The weapon was designed to allow one person to parachute from any type of aircraft carrying the weapon package and place it in a harbor or other strategic location that could be accessed from the sea. Another parachutist without a weapon package would follow the first to provide support as needed.

The team would place the weapon package in the target location, set the timer, and swim out into the ocean where they would be retrieved by a submarine or a high-speed surface water craft.

=== MADM ===
The Medium Atomic Demolition Munition (MADM) was a tactical nuclear weapon developed by the United States during the Cold War. They were designed to be used as nuclear land mines and for other tactical purposes, with a relatively low explosive yield from a W45 warhead, between 1 and 15 kilotons. Each MADM weighed around 400 lb (181 kg) total. They were produced between 1965 and 1986.

== Russian controversy with ADMs ==
In the aftermath of the collapse of the Soviet Union, the United States and Russia developed a deep cooperation designed to assure the security of Russia's nuclear arsenal. While a number of steps were taken to consolidate and improve the security of Russia's strategic nuclear arms, particularly under the Cooperative Threat Reduction program, concern remained over the security of the Russian tactical nuclear weapons arsenal. In particular, a serious debate arose over the status of what are known as "suitcase nuclear weapons", very small Soviet-era nuclear devices. The term suitcase nuke is generally used to describe any type of small, man-portable nuclear device although there is serious debate as to the validity of the term itself. In a worst case analysis, a suitcase nuke would be small enough to be hand-carried into a major population or leadership center undetected and then detonated. Although, by most accounts, the yield of such a device is likely far less than ten kilotons, its combined effects may have the potential to kill tens of thousands, if not more. There is a great deal of confusion over just how many of these suitcase devices exist or if they even exist at all. By some accounts, the Soviet Union built hundreds of these devices, of which several dozen were missing. Based on other reports, suitcase nukes were never built in large numbers or were never deployed.

There is no definitive open source information on the number, location, security, or status of these suitcase nuclear bombs. No Soviet suitcase bomb or any of its presumed components has ever been found, much less used, in the three decades after the collapse of the USSR. As of 2018, it is likely they would not work or would fizzle at worst by lack of the required specialized maintenance common to all nuclear weapons.

=== Frontline broadcast about suitcase nukes ===
In May 1997 General Alexander Lebed told an American Congressional delegation that Russia had lost dozens of atomic demolition units. In a later interview with American investigative program 60 Minutes he revised his estimate, saying that they had lost more than 100 units - a claim that the Russian government rejected.

On 23 February 1999, the PBS investigative program Frontline aired a special on Russian nuclear security that included a series of interviews with several of the individuals who spoke publicly during the 1997 debate on suitcase nukes. Alexei Yablokov appeared and reasserted his position that some number of small atomic charges had been built, even going so far as to speak of their weight ("thirty kilos, forty kilos"). Yablokov accused the Russian government of misleading the public on the situation, pointing to the inconsistencies in denials by the FSB, MINATOM, and the information that was publicly available on the Internet ("... if I'm looking at a [picture] of an American weapon, I must be sure that we have an analogy ..."). On the same program, Congressman Curt Weldon recounted a meeting he held in December 1997 with Defense Minister Igor Sergeyev. During this meeting, Weldon asked Sergeyev specifically about the small ADM devices. According to Weldon, Sergeyev's response was: "Yes, we did build them, we are in the process of destroying them, and by the year 2000 we will have destroyed all of our small atomic demolition devices." Weldon went on to express confidence in Sergeyev's statement but also raised concern as to whether or not the Russian government had accounted for all of its nuclear devices. Frontline also featured several American and Russian experts and officials who presented differing views on the subject. General Vladimir Dvorkin, a former officer in the Strategic Rocket Forces and subsequently Director of the Fourth Central Research Institute in Moscow, admitted that "some small devices existed in the United States and Russia" but that something that small would have a very limited shelf life and would have little deterrent value. Dvorkin discounted the validity of statements, saying "... Lebed is probably the least informed person as far as this topic is concerned ... an expert in military folklore." The former commander of U.S. nuclear forces, retired General Eugene Habiger, also appeared on Frontline and expressed doubt about the size of such devices, calling the term suitcase "a little optimistic." Additionally, Habiger spoke of the systems set up by the Russians to track their nuclear weapons, saying "If the Russians were as deadly serious about the accountability of the nuclear weapons that I saw and have been involved with, I can only surmise that they have the same concerns with the smaller weapons."

=== Suitcase nukes and bin Laden ===
By late 1999, the concern had expanded from nuclear armed Chechen rebels to include concerns about Osama bin Laden's al-Qaeda network. Although unsubstantiated, some reports suggested that bin Laden had already managed to acquire weapons from the Russian nuclear arsenal. In August 1999, Voice of America broadcast a story about the threat posed by bin Laden. In it, Yossef Bodansky, an American terrorism analyst, author, and head of the Congressional Task Force on Terrorism and Non-Conventional Warfare claimed that he had learned, through sources in Russia and the Middle East, that bin Laden had "a few of the ex-Soviet 'suitcase' bombs acquired through the Chechens.″ Two months later, on 5 October, the Moscow daily Komsomolskaya Pravda published an interview in which Bodansky, citing "various intelligence sources," claimed that bin Laden had acquired, through Kazakhstan, "from several to twenty tactical nuclear warheads." Bodansky also claimed that bin Laden had attempted to buy "nuclear suitcases" in Kazakhstan. In the same article, the director of the Atomic Energy Agency of the Republic of Kazakhstan declared that all nuclear weapons had been removed "long ago" from Kazakhstan and that suitcase nuclear devices were never built in Kazakh territory. The head of counterintelligence for the Kazakhstani Committee on National Security told Komsomolskaya Pravda that all nuclear weapons were removed from Kazakhstan in 1995 in accordance with the START I treaty and denied reports that bin Laden had attempted to purchase nuclear weapons there. Bodansky's claims surfaced again on 25 October 1999 when The Jerusalem Report published an article on bin Laden and suitcase nuclear devices. In this report, Bodansky's claim of "a few to twenty" weapons was repeated. In addition, Bodansky claimed that bin Laden had purchased the weapons using "$30 million in cash and two tons of Afghan heroin." Very little information is available to back Bodansky's claims, however, and they remain in doubt.

=== Suitcase nukes concerns post-9/11 ===
Following the 11 September terrorist attacks on the United States, fresh attention was focused on al-Qaeda's desire for weapons of mass destruction but with more urgency than in the past. A serious concern was that al-Qaeda terrorists might attempt to obtain Russian warheads or weapon-usable nuclear materials. Former GRU Colonel Stanislav Lunev's 1998 statements were resurrected following the attacks. During an appearance on CBS, Lunev reasserted his claim that suitcase bombs existed, even going so far as to claim that bin Laden had obtained several of the devices from the former Soviet Union. In the same segment, Michael O'Hanlon of the Brookings Institution discounted Lunev's claims: "Our view is that this is not a major worry. If those devices ever existed, they were under the control of the Soviet state, and not available to terrorists." On 20 December 2001 UPI reported that the FBI had stepped up its investigation into terrorist access to Russian nuclear stockpiles. Representative Weldon, once again at the forefront of the debate, stated "Do I think he [bin Laden] has a [sic] small atomic demolition munitions, which were built by the Soviets in the Cold War? Probably doubtful."

On 17 January 2002, Russia's Atomic Energy Minister, Aleksandr Rumyantsev, told Interfax it would be impossible for terrorists to construct a portable nuclear weapon, citing a lack of "necessary potential and materials." The Interfax report went on to state "major nuclear powers have an effective system of control over miniature nuclear charges, which weigh a total of several dozen kilograms." According to Rumyantsev "all of these [miniature nuclear devices] are registered ... it is technically impossible for such charges to find their way into the hands of terrorists."

== See also ==
- Tactical nuclear weapons
- Suitcase nuke
- Blue Peacock - British conceptualised nuclear land mine
- List of nuclear weapons
