= W80 (nuclear warhead) =

W80 nuclear warhead
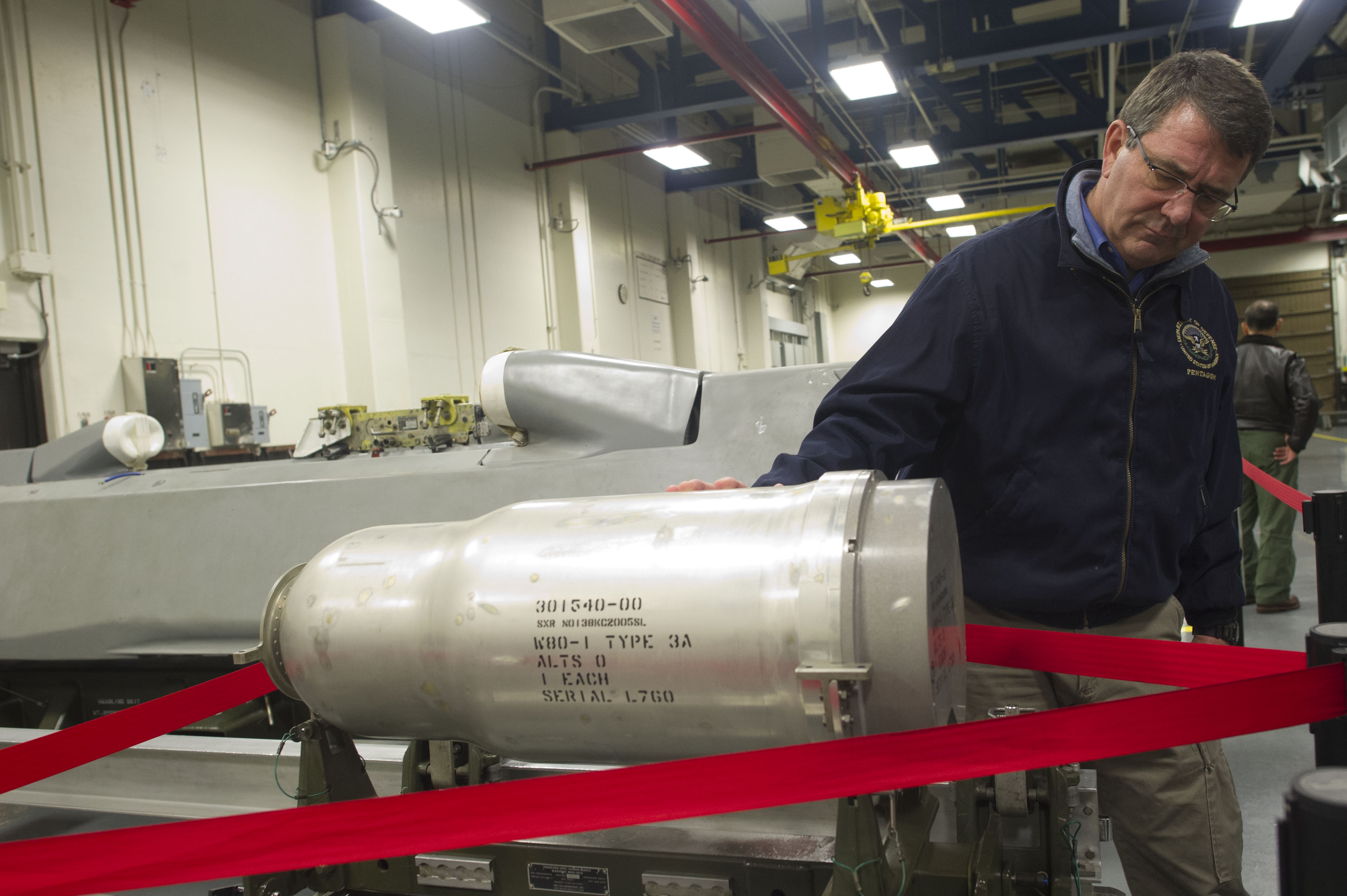
- A W80 nuclear warhead with Secretary of Defense Ashton B. Carter
- Type: Nuclear weapon
- Place of origin: United States

Production history
- Designer: Los Alamos National Laboratory (W80-0,1); Lawrence Livermore National Laboratory (W80-2,3,4)
- Designed: June 1976
- Produced: January 1979
- No. built: 2,117
- Variants: 5

Specifications
- Mass: 290 lb (130 kg)
- Length: 31.4 inches (80 cm)
- Diameter: 11.8 in (30 cm)
- Blast yield: 5 or 150 kilotons of TNT (21 or 628 TJ)

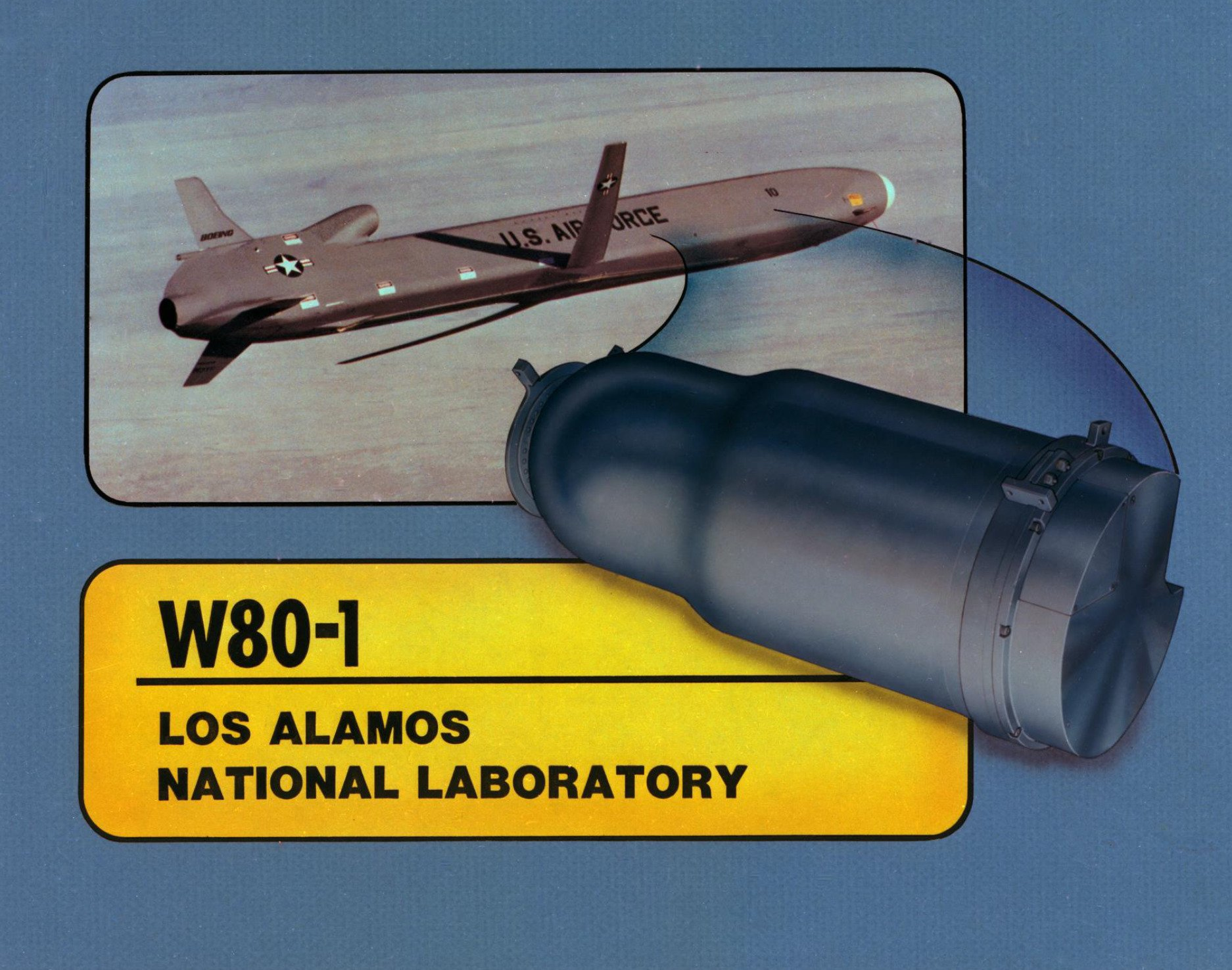
W80 Mod 1 warhead

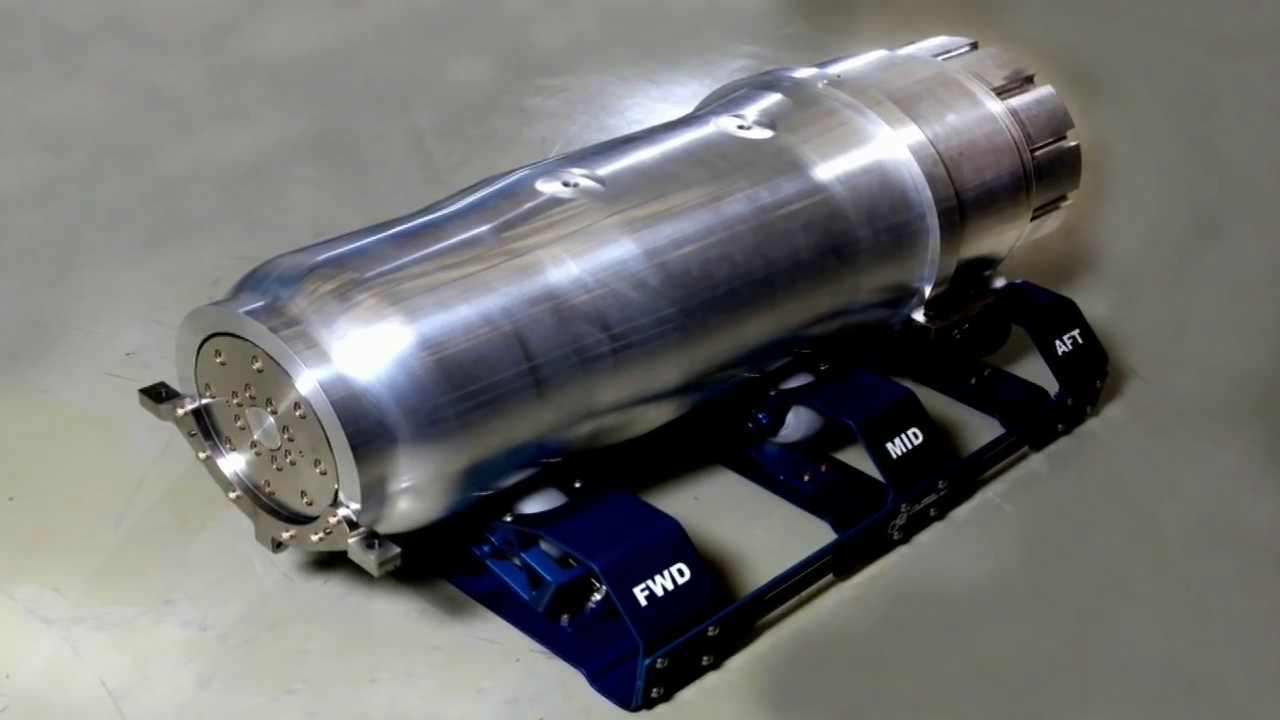
W80 Mod 4 warhead for the LRSO program.

The W80 is a low to intermediate yield two-stage thermonuclear warhead deployed by the U.S. enduring stockpile with a variable yield ("dial-a-yield") of 5 or 150 kilotons of TNT (21 or 628 TJ).

The warhead was designed for deployment on cruise missiles and is used in all nuclear-armed AGM-86 Air-Launched Cruise Missile (ALCM) and AGM-129 Advanced Cruise Missile (ACM) missiles deployed by the US Air Force, and in the US Navy's BGM-109 Tomahawk. It is essentially a modification of the widely deployed B61 bomb, which is the basis of most of the US stockpile of nuclear gravity bombs. The very similar W84 warhead was deployed on the retired BGM-109G Ground Launched Cruise Missile.

It was designed at Los Alamos National Laboratory in Los Alamos, New Mexico.

== Dimensions ==
The W80 is physically quite small: the physics package itself is about the size of a conventional Mk.81 250-pound (110 kg) bomb, 11.8 inches (30 cm) in diameter and 31.4 inches (80 cm) long, and only slightly heavier at about 290 pounds (130 kg).

== History ==
=== Early development ===
The Los Alamos National Laboratory began development on the W80 in June 1976, with the brief of producing a custom weapon for the cruise missiles then under construction. The basic design was derived from the B61. The main design differences are presumably a smaller secondary producing only 150 kt (630 TJ) yield (the B61 producing a maximum of 170 kt (710 TJ) in the tactical variants and 340 kt (1,400 TJ) in the strategic variants) and simplification of the design giving the weapon only two yield settings; 5 and 150 kt (21 and 628 TJ).

Production of the W80 mod 1 (W80-1) to arm the ALCM started in January 1979, and a number of warheads had been completed by January 1981 when the first low-temperature test was carried out. To everyone's surprise the test delivered a much lower yield than was expected, apparently due to problems in the TATB based insensitive high explosives used to fire the primary. This problem turned out to affect several models of the B61-based line, and production of all weapons was suspended until a solution was achieved. Production restarted in February 1982.

In March 1982, designers began working on a W80 variant intended for the Navy's Tomahawk program. The W80 mod 0 (W80-0) used "supergrade" fission fuel, which has less radioactivity, in the primary in place of the conventional plutonium used in the Air Force's version. "Supergrade" is industry parlance for plutonium alloy bearing an exceptionally high fraction of Pu-239 (>95%), leaving a very low amount of Pu-240 which is a gamma emitter in addition to being a high spontaneous fission isotope. Such plutonium is produced from fuel rods that have been irradiated a very short time as measured in MW-Day/Ton burnup. Such low irradiation times limit the amount of additional neutron capture and therefore buildup of alternate isotope products such as Pu-240 in the rod, and also by consequence is considerably more expensive to produce, needing far more rods irradiated and processed for a given amount of plutonium. Submarine crew members routinely operate in proximity to stored weapons in torpedo rooms, in contrast to the air force where exposure to warheads is relatively brief. The first models were delivered in December 1983 and the Mod 0 went into full production in March 1984.

Production of the W80 was completed by September 1990, although the exact date at which the respective Mod 0 and Mod 1 runs ended is not clear. A total of 1750 Mod 1 and 367 Mod 0 devices were delivered; 1,000 Mod 1 devices were deployed on the original ALCM, another 400 on the later ACM, and 350 Mod 0s on the Tomahawk.

Some of the original ALCMs would later have their mod 1 warheads removed and instead be fitted with conventional warheads producing the CALCM conversion. Under START II only 400 ACMs would have retained their nuclear warheads, and the rest would have been converted to CALCMs and their warheads removed to the inactive stockpile.

=== 2007 nuclear weapons incident ===
On August 30, 2007, six cruise missiles armed with W80-1 warheads were mistakenly loaded onto a B-52 and flown from Minot Air Force Base, North Dakota, to Barksdale Air Force Base, Louisiana, on a mission to transport cruise missiles for decommissioning. It was not discovered that the six missiles had nuclear warheads until the plane landed at Barksdale, leaving the warheads unaccounted for, for over 36 hours. 5th Bomb Wing failed its nuclear surety inspection in late May 2008. 2nd Bomb Wing from Barksdale Air Force Base took over the role until the wing was recertified on 15 August 2008.

=== W80-4 refurbishment and LRSO ===
In 2014, a life extension program (LEP) for the W80-1 was started and the LEP warhead was given the W80-4 designation. The warhead will be used on the new AGM-181 LRSO cruise missile. The first production unit is expected to be completed in 2027. According to public descriptions of the program, the warhead will offer no increased military capability, only refurbishing and updating components, and increasing weapon safety and reliability.

In FY2022, the National Nuclear Security Administration requested funding for the W80-4 ALT-SLCM variant of the warhead, for use on a new US Navy sea-launched cruise missile to be deployed in the late 2020s.

== Mods ==
Mod	Status	Date	Number produced	Yields	PAL type	Notes
0	All dismantled	1984 to approx. 2011	367	5 or 150 kt (21 or 628 TJ)	Cat D	Warhead for BGM-109A Tomahawk TLAM-N missile. Warhead used supergrade plutonium due to weapon's proximity to crew.
1	In service	since September 1981	1750	5 or 150 kt (21 or 628 TJ)	Cat D	First production units. Warhead for AGM-86 ALCM and AGM-129 ACM cruise missiles.
2	Never entered production		0		Cat D	Life extension program for W80-0, cancelled in 2006
3	Never entered production		0		Cat D	Life extension program for W80-1, cancelled in 2006
4	In development	projected 2027	More than 500 planned	Unknown	Unknown	Life extension program for W80-1. Warhead will be used on new AGM-181 Long Range Stand Off Weapon (LRSO) cruise missile under development.

== See also ==
- List of nuclear weapons
