= Mark 26 nuclear bomb =

The Mark 26 nuclear bomb was related to the Mark 21. Development of the Mk-26 started on September 1, 1954. At the end of July 1955, the design of the Mk-21 was released for production, while the design for the Mk-26 was not. The "Clean" Mk-21C which was tested in the Redwing Navajo shot did not interest the US Air Force, or AEC. As the decision not to pursue the "clean" Mk-21 closely coincided with the decision to terminate development of the Mk-26 in April 1957, it is possible that Mk-26 was the designation for the clean version of the Mk-21.
