= W74 (nuclear warhead) =

Experimental nuclear weapon

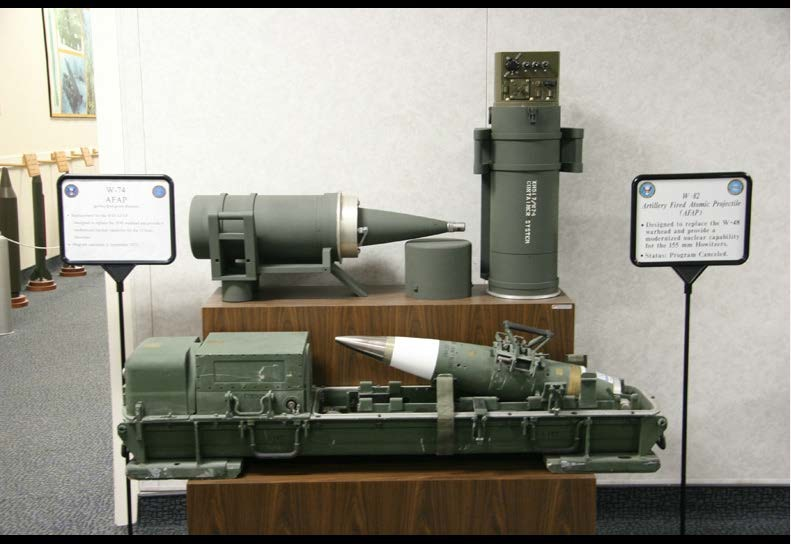
W74 AFAP (top)

The W74 warhead, also known as XM517, was an American nuclear artillery shell that was cancelled before production.

Responding to a 1969 United States Army request for a replacement for the W48 155 mm artillery shell, the Los Alamos National Laboratory started development of the W74. However, by mid 1973 the program was discontinued without producing a weapon for general production. The primary reasons for the cancellation of the W74 were the obsolete technology used and high cost. The weapon only employed fission, had no improvements in accuracy, and had no capability to be further developed as an "enhanced radiation" (neutron) device; the result was a weapon that did not provide new capabilities, all with a per shell cost of $425,000 (1973).

== W75 ==
The W75 warhead, also known as the XM673, was the 8-inch (200 mm) equivalent of the W74. It was viewed by many as being an obsolete system, expensive to deploy and not worth pursuing. Development was started in 1973 at the Livermore Lab and terminated two years later.
