= W31 =

Nuclear warhead used by the US

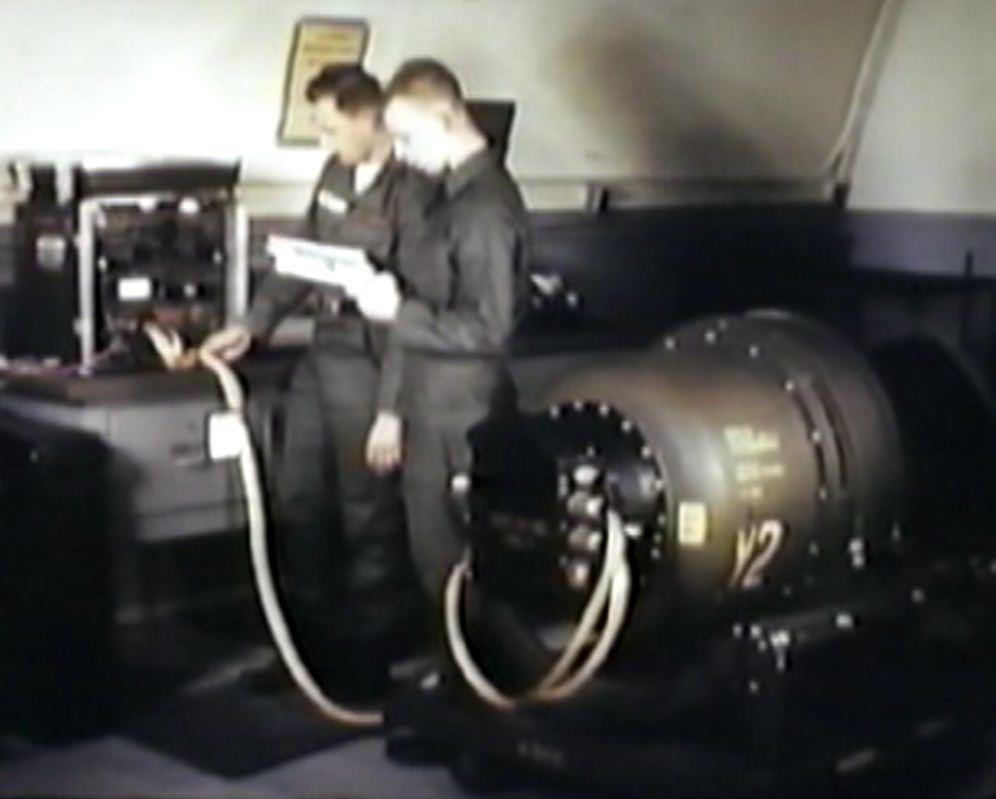
A W31 Y2 nuclear warhead undergoing maintenance

The W31 was an American nuclear warhead used for two US missiles and as an atomic demolition munition.

The W31 was produced from 1959, with the last versions phased out in 1989.

All versions were roughly the same dimensions and weight: 28–30 in (710–760 mm) in diameter, 39–39.5 in (990–1,000 mm) long, and weighing 900–945 lb (408–429 kg). The W31 is a boosted fission nuclear bomb.

== Uses ==
=== Nike Hercules missile ===
The Nike Hercules was a surface-to-air or surface-to-surface missile system deployed around US cities and various locations in Europe and Japan. Most, but not all, of these missiles were deployed with nuclear warheads. In South Florida, half of the Nike Hercules missiles of the Homestead-Miami Defense were armed with the T-45 high-explosive warheads.

Three yield variants, of 2, 20, and 40 kilotons, were deployed on these missiles starting in 1958 and finally retired in 1989. 2,550 of these models were produced. The 20 kt version of the W-31 was solely used in the Nike Hercules system.

A similar variant, the XW-37, was a high yield version of the XW-31. Development started in January 1956. Three months later, the XW-31 was redesignated XW-31Y1 (for yield 1) and the XW-37 designation was changed to XW-31Y2 (for yield 2).

=== MGR-1 Honest John rocket ===
The Honest John was a short-range surface-to-surface tactical ballistic rocket used by the US Army.

Three yield variants, also apparently 2, 20 and 40 kilotons, were deployed on Honest John missiles from 1959 to 1987. A total of 1,650 Honest John W31 warheads were produced.

=== Atomic Demolition Munitions (ADM) ===
Between 1960 and 1965, the W31 Mod 1 was stockpiled as an atomic demolition munition. Allegedly, four of the five stockpiled W31 yields were used in the ADM version of the weapon, i.e. four of 1, 2, 12, 20 or 40 kilotonnes of TNT (4.2, 8.4, 50.2, 83.7 or 167.4 TJ). 300 weapons were produced.

== See also ==
- List of nuclear weapons
- MGR-1 Honest John
- Nike Hercules
- Atomic demolition munition
