= Operation Nougat =

Series of 1960s US nuclear tests

- Nougat Gnome, 3.1 kilotons

Information
- Country: United States
- Test site: near Carlsbad, New Mexico; NTS Area 12, Rainier Mesa; NTS Area 15; NTS Area 16, Shoshone Mountain; NTS Area 18, Buckboard Mesa; NTS, Areas 1-4, 6-10, Yucca Flat
- Period: 1961-1962
- Number of tests: 44
- Test type: cratering, underground shaft, tunnel
- Max. yield: 67 kilotonnes of TNT (280 TJ)

Test series chronology

Operation Nougat was a series of 44 nuclear tests conducted (with one exception) at the Nevada Test Site in 1961 and 1962, immediately after the Soviet Union abrogated a testing moratorium, with the US' Mink test shot taking place the day before the Soviets test-detonated the Tsar Bomba. Most tests were limited-yield underground test shots. New designs would be further developed in atmospheric testing during Operation Dominic I and II.

Operation Dominic I and II would follow Operation Nougat, with some testing overlap. Operation Hardtack II preceded Nougat and the testing moratorium.

== Tests ==
=== Antler ===
Antler was the first shot fired as part of the resumption of nuclear testing by the United States. Fired 15 September 1961, containment was immediately lost when the shot vented via the tunnel portal, destroying much of the test data. This was a recurring problem for tunnel tests of the era. The problem was thought to be caused by water above the blast zone draining into the explosion cavity where it was vaporised and escaped as steam.

=== Shrew ===
Shrew was the first Los Alamos test after the resumption of testing. The device was buried to a depth of 325 ft (99 m) in a canister 32.5 ft (9.9 m) long. The shaft was 32 in (810 mm) wide, lined with 0.5 in (12 1/2 mm) steel, and backfilled with sand to above the canister and concrete to the surface. Post-test, some radioactivity was detected by sampling aircraft.

== British tests ==
Some accounts include the first British nuclear weapons test at the Nevada Test Site, shot Pampas, as part of Nougat. See British nuclear testing in the United States for more details.

== Full list of tests ==
United States' Nougat series tests and detonations
| Name (Note: The US, France and Great Britain have code-named their test events, while the USSR and China did not, and therefore have only test numbers (with some exceptions – Soviet peaceful explosions were named). Word translations into English in parentheses unless the name is a proper noun. A dash followed by a number indicates a member of a salvo event. The US also sometimes named the individual explosions in such a salvo test, which results in "name1 – 1(with name2)". If test is canceled or aborted, then the row data like date and location discloses the intended plans, where known.) | Date time (UT) | Local time zone (Note: To convert the UT time into standard local, add the number of hours in parentheses to the UT time; for local daylight saving time, add one additional hour. If the result is earlier than 00:00, add 24 hours and subtract 1 from the day; if it is 24:00 or later, subtract 24 hours and add 1 to the day. Historical time zone data obtained from the IANA time zone database.) | Location (Note: Rough place name and a latitude/longitude reference; for rocket-carried tests, the launch location is specified before the detonation location, if known. Some locations are extremely accurate; others (like airdrops and space blasts) may be quite inaccurate. "~" indicates a likely pro-forma rough location, shared with other tests in that same area.) | Elevation + height (Note: Elevation is the ground level at the point directly below the explosion relative to sea level; height is the additional distance added or subtracted by tower, balloon, shaft, tunnel, air drop or other contrivance. For rocket bursts the ground level is "N/A". In some cases it is not clear if the height is absolute or relative to ground, for example, Plumbbob/John. No number or units indicates the value is unknown, while "0" means zero. Sorting on this column is by elevation and height added together.) | Delivery (Note: Atmospheric, airdrop, balloon, gun, cruise missile, rocket, surface, tower, and barge are all disallowed by the Partial Nuclear Test Ban Treaty. Sealed shaft and tunnel are underground, and remained useful under the PTBT. Intentional cratering tests are borderline; they occurred under the treaty, were sometimes protested, and generally overlooked if the test was declared to be a peaceful use.) Purpose (Note: Include weapons development, weapon effects, safety test, transport safety test, war, science, joint verification and industrial/peaceful, which may be further broken down.) | Device (Note: Designations for test items where known, "?" indicates some uncertainty about the preceding value, nicknames for particular devices in quotes. This category of information is often not officially disclosed.) | Yield (Note: Estimated energy yield in tons, kilotons, and megatons. A ton of TNT equivalent is defined as 4.184 gigajoules (1 gigacalorie).) | Fallout (Note: Radioactive emission to the atmosphere aside from prompt neutrons, where known. The measured species is only iodine-131 if mentioned, otherwise it is all species. No entry means unknown, probably none if underground and "all" if not; otherwise notation for whether measured on the site only or off the site, where known, and the measured amount of radioactivity released.) | References | Notes |
|---|---|---|---|---|---|---|---|---|---|---|
| Antler | September 15, 1961 17:00:00.12 | PST (-8 hrs) | NTS Area U12e.03a 37.1879°N 116.20863°W | 2,254 m (7,395 ft) - 402.03 m (1,319.0 ft) | tunnel, weapons development | W-45 | 2.6 kt | Venting detected off site, 210 kCi (7,800 TBq) | | |
| Shrew | September 16, 1961 19:45:00.12 | PST (-8 hrs) | NTS Area U3ac 37.0484°N 116.03367°W | 1,200 m (3,900 ft) - 98.07 m (321.8 ft) | underground shaft, weapons development | Scarab device | 17 t | Venting detected on site, less than 490 Ci (18,000 GBq) | | |
| Boomer | October 1, 1961 21:30:00.12 | PST (-8 hrs) | NTS Area U3aa 37.04829°N 116.03526°W | 1,200 m (3,900 ft) - 100.64 m (330.2 ft) | underground shaft, weapons development | Scarab device | less than 0.1 kt | Venting detected on site, less than 2.5 kCi (93 TBq) | | |
| Chena | October 10, 1961 18:00:00.13 | PST (-8 hrs) | NTS Area U12b.09 37.19423°N 116.20791°W | 2,250 m (7,380 ft) - 255.42 m (838.0 ft) | tunnel, weapons development | Tsetse and Arrow | less than 20 kt | Venting detected on site, 760 Ci (28,000 GBq) | | Similar to Fishbowl Swordfish, yield much lower than predicted. |
| Mink | October 29, 1961 18:30:00.13 | PST (-8 hrs) | NTS Area U3ae 37.04851°N 116.03195°W | 1,201 m (3,940 ft) - 192.1 m (630 ft) | underground shaft, weapons development | Tsetse | less than 20 kt | Venting detected on site, 500 Ci (18,000 GBq) | | similar to HT-II Quay, HT-I Linden, fizzle. |
| Fisher | December 3, 1961 23:04:59.63 | PST (-8 hrs) | NTS Area U3ah 37.04581°N 116.02853°W | 1,198 m (3,930 ft) - 363.72 m (1,193.3 ft) | underground shaft, weapons development | Tsetse | 13.4 kt | Venting detected on site, less than 500 Ci (18,000 GBq) | | Repeat of Mink, yield below predicted due to Zipper failure. |
| Gnome | December 10, 1961 19:00:00.0 | MST (-7 hrs) | near Carlsbad, New Mexico 32.26298°N 103.86592°W | 1,013 m (3,323 ft) - 360 m (1,180 ft) | underground shaft, peaceful research | Kinglet | 3.1 kt | Venting detected off site | | Project Gnome, fired in salt dome, cavity formed was 170 ft (52 m) in diameter, and 80 ft (24 m) high, some radioactivity accidentally released and detected off-site. Shaft drilled 341 m (1,119 ft) to SW. |
| Mad | December 13, 1961 18:00:00.16 | PST (-8 hrs) | NTS Area U9a 37.12656°N 116.04962°W | 1,254 m (4,114 ft) - 219.15 m (719.0 ft) | underground shaft, weapons development | Kinglet | 500 t | I-131 venting detected on site, 0 | | Similar to Hoosic and Stillwater, yield below predicted, attempt to standardize low yield energy source for future experiments. |
| Ringtail | December 17, 1961 16:35:00.13 | PST (-8 hrs) | NTS Area U3ak 37.04317°N 116.02616°W | 1,196 m (3,924 ft) - 362.99 m (1,190.9 ft) | underground shaft, weapons development | Scarab | less than 20 kt | Venting detected on site, less than 10 Ci (370 GBq) | | Possible XW-54 test, similar to Shrew and Boomer, purpose to optimize small light system for high yield tactical weapon. |
| Feather | December 22, 1961 16:30:00.13 | PST (-8 hrs) | NTS Area U12b.08 37.1949°N 116.20916°W | 2,242 m (7,356 ft) - 247.5 m (812 ft) | tunnel, weapons development | | 150 t | Venting detected off site, 380 Ci (14,000 GBq) | | "...results quite striking.". |
| Stoat | January 9, 1962 16:30:00.14 | PST (-8 hrs) | NTS Area U3ap 37.04459°N 116.03592°W | 1,198 m (3,930 ft) - 302.33 m (991.9 ft) | underground shaft, weapons development | Croton ("Test of new multipoint system") | 5.1 kt | Venting detected on site, 8 Ci (300 GBq) | | Performed as expected, 1st in series to develop new multi-point detonation system, similar to Agouti, Armadillo, Ermine, Chinchilla I/II. |
| Agouti | January 18, 1962 18:00:00.13 | PST (-8 hrs) | NTS Area U3ao 37.0472°N 116.03523°W | 1,200 m (3,900 ft) - 260.95 m (856.1 ft) | underground shaft, weapons development | Croton | 6.4 kt | | | Develop test for new 10 in (250 mm) implosion system, similar to Stoat. |
| Dormouse | January 30, 1962 18:00:00.13 | PST (-8 hrs) | NTS Area U3aq 37.04679°N 116.04034°W | 1,200 m (3,900 ft) - 363.14 m (1,191.4 ft) | underground shaft, weapons development | Tsetse in final W50 configuration | 10 kt | I-131 venting detected, 0 | | Configuration optimization test, similar to Mink, Fisher, Raccoon, Dormouse Prime, Packrat. |
| Stillwater | February 8, 1962 18:00:00.16 | PST (-8 hrs) | NTS Area U9c 37.1272°N 116.05354°W | 1,259 m (4,131 ft) - 181.36 m (595.0 ft) | underground shaft, weapons development | Kinglet | 3.1 kt | I-131 venting detected, 0 | | Similar to Mad and Hoosic. |
| Armadillo | February 9, 1962 16:30:00.13 | PST (-8 hrs) | NTS Area U3ar 37.04354°N 116.03981°W | 1,198 m (3,930 ft) - 239.69 m (786.4 ft) | underground shaft, weapons development | Croton | 7.1 kt | Venting detected on site, less than 120 Ci (4,400 GBq) | | Develop test for new 10 in (250 mm) implosion system, similar Stoat. |
| Hardhat | February 15, 1962 18:00:00.1 | PST (-8 hrs) | NTS Area U15a 37.22626°N 116.06018°W | 1,532 m (5,026 ft) - 287.43 m (943.0 ft) | underground shaft, weapon effect | Mark 7 | 5.7 kt | I-131 venting detected, 0 | | Test of underground structure hardening. |
| Chinchilla I | February 19, 1962 16:30:00.13 | PST (-8 hrs) | NTS Area U3ag 37.04905°N 116.03023°W | 1,201 m (3,940 ft) - 150.08 m (492.4 ft) | underground shaft, weapons development | Croton | 1.9 kt | Venting detected on site, 2 Ci (74 GBq) | | Test of new 10 in (250 mm) implosion system, performed as expected, showed device not 1-point safe. |
| Codsaw | February 19, 1962 17:50:00.16 | PST (-8 hrs) | NTS Area U9g 37.12743°N 116.03806°W | 1,258 m (4,127 ft) - 212.14 m (696.0 ft) | underground shaft, weapons development | Kinglet | 2 kt | Venting detected on site, less than 1 kCi (37 TBq) | | Similar to Hoosic, Hudson, Arikaree. |
| Cimarron | February 23, 1962 18:00:00.16 | PST (-8 hrs) | NTS Area U9h 37.12881°N 116.04918°W | 1,256 m (4,121 ft) - 304.8 m (1,000 ft) | underground shaft, weapons development | Starling in XW-56 configuration | 11.9 kt | Venting detected, 750 Ci (28,000 GBq) | | Confirmed advanced warhead design, device performed better than expected. |
| Platypus | February 24, 1962 16:30:00.13 | PST (-8 hrs) | NTS Area U3ad 37.0483°N 116.03264°W | 1,200 m (3,900 ft) - 57.84 m (189.8 ft) | cratering, weapons development | Scarab | less than 20 kt | I-131 venting detected, 0 | | similar to Shrew, Boomer, Ringtail. |
| Danny Boy | March 5, 1962 18:15:00.12 | PST (-8 hrs) | NTS Area U18a 37.11091°N 116.3658°W | 1,641 m (5,384 ft) - 30 m (98 ft) | cratering, weapon effect | | 430 t | Venting detected off site, 850 kCi (31,000 TBq) | | Test of atomic demolition munition (ADM) cratering effects in basalt, crater 265 ft × 84 ft (81 m × 26 m), design yield 470 tonnes. |
| Ermine | March 6, 1962 16:30:00.13 | PST (-8 hrs) | NTS Area U3ab 37.04837°N 116.0344°W | 1,201 m (3,940 ft) - 73.15 m (240.0 ft) | underground shaft, safety experiment | Croton | less than 20 kt | I-131 venting detected, 0 | | Test of new 10 in (250 mm) implosion system, 1-point safety test. |
| Brazos | March 8, 1962 18:00:00.21 | PST (-8 hrs) | NTS Area U9d 37.12212°N 116.04976°W | 1,254 m (4,114 ft) - 256.34 m (841.0 ft) | underground shaft, weapons development | XW-55 primary | 8.4 kt | Venting detected on site, 1.1 kCi (41 TBq) | | Successful system proof test, developmental test of advanced implosion system, design yield 5-10 kt. |
| Hognose | March 15, 1962 16:30:00.13 | PST (-8 hrs) | NTS Area U3ai 37.04393°N 116.03186°W | 1,198 m (3,930 ft) - 240.33 m (788.5 ft) | underground shaft, weapons development | Test of Zippo device fired in Operation Dominic | 8 kt | I-131 venting detected, 0 | | similar to HT-II Mercury and Oberon. |
| Hoosic | March 28, 1962 18:00:00.16 | PST (-8 hrs) | NTS Area U9j 37.12437°N 116.03483°W | 1,264 m (4,147 ft) - 186.84 m (613.0 ft) | underground shaft, weapons development | Kinglet | 3.4 kt | Venting detected, 10 kCi (370 TBq) | | Test to determine minimum boosted yield for device previously tested in Mad and Stillwater, predicted yield 2–3.5 kt, similar to Hudson and Arikaree. |
| Chinchilla II | March 31, 1962 18:00:00.13 | PST (-8 hrs) | NTS Area U3as 37.04687°N 116.03776°W | 1,200 m (3,900 ft) - 136.67 m (448.4 ft) | underground shaft, weapons development | Croton | 2 kt | Venting detected on site, less than 10 Ci (370 GBq) | | Retest of Chinchilla I which was not 1-point safe, similar to Stoat. |
| Dormouse Prime | April 5, 1962 18:00:00.13 | PST (-8 hrs) | NTS Area U3az 37.04446°N 116.02425°W | 1,197 m (3,927 ft) - 261.03 m (856.4 ft) | underground shaft, weapons development | Tsetse in W50 configuration | 10.6 kt | I-131 venting detected, 0 | | Yield verification test, design yield 10.5 kt, boron lined shot hole, similar to Dormouse, Mink, Fisher, Raccoon, Packrat, HT-I Linden, HT-II Quay. |
| Passaic | April 6, 1962 18:00:00.16 | PST (-8 hrs) | NTS Area U9l (i?) 37.11762°N 116.04487°W | 1,248 m (4,094 ft) - 233.48 m (766.0 ft) | underground shaft, weapons development | Robin in W47 configuration | 9 kt | Venting detected, 600 Ci (22,000 GBq) | | Verification test. |
| Hudson | April 12, 1962 18:00:00.16 | PST (-8 hrs) | NTS Area U9n (h?) 37.12719°N 116.04577°W | 1,253 m (4,111 ft) - 150.88 m (495.0 ft) | underground shaft, weapons development | Kinglet | 1 kt | Venting detected, 500 Ci (18,000 GBq) | | similar to Arikaree, Hoosic, Codsaw'. |
| Platte | April 14, 1962 18:00:00.13 | PST (-8 hrs) | NTS Area U12k.01 37.22198°N 116.15832°W | 1,695 m (5,561 ft) - 170.69 m (560.0 ft) | tunnel, weapons development | Kinglet | 1.9 kt | Venting detected off site, 1.9 MCi (70 PBq) | | Yield reproducibility test, failed, retested in Des Moines. |
| Dead | April 21, 1962 18:40:00.16 | PST (-8 hrs) | NTS Area U9k 37.11895°N 116.03237°W | 1,272 m (4,173 ft) - 193.24 m (634.0 ft) | underground shaft, weapons development | May have been "Rail" device | 3 kt | Venting detected, 40 kCi (1,500 TBq) | | |
| Black | April 27, 1962 18:00:00.16 | PST (-8 hrs) | NTS Area U9p 37.11843°N 116.03857°W | 1,259 m (4,131 ft) - 217.63 m (714.0 ft) | underground shaft, weapons development | Kinglet in XW-55 mockup | 5 kt | Venting detected, 150 Ci (5,600 GBq) | | Thermonuke mockup. |
| Paca | May 7, 1962 19:33:00.14 | PST (-8 hrs) | NTS Area U3ax 37.04654°N 116.02567°W | 1,199 m (3,934 ft) - 258.32 m (847.5 ft) | underground shaft, weapons development | Croton primary with Zuppy secondary | 8 kt | Venting detected on site, less than 10 Ci (370 GBq) | | Test of "100 lb/100 kt" class device. |
| Arikaree | May 10, 1962 15:00:00.16 | PST (-8 hrs) | NTS Area U9r 37.12754°N 116.04917°W | 1,254 m (4,114 ft) - 166.73 m (547.0 ft) | underground shaft, weapons development | Kinglet | less than 20 kt | Venting detected, 2 kCi (74 TBq) | | similar to Hudson, Hoosic, Codsaw. |
| Aardvark | May 12, 1962 19:00:00.1 | PST (-8 hrs) | NTS Area U3am(s) 37.06512°N 116.03092°W | 1,214 m (3,983 ft) - 434.04 m (1,424.0 ft) | underground shaft, weapons development | TX-33Y2 AFAP | 40 kt | Venting detected on site, less than 10 Ci (370 GBq) | | One of only four gun-type weapons ever tested, along with Little Boy, Grable and Laplace. The TX-33 was a gun shell. |
| Eel | May 19, 1962 15:00:00.16 | PST (-8 hrs) | NTS Area U9m 37.12256°N 116.04809°W | 1,253 m (4,111 ft) - 217.63 m (714.0 ft) | underground shaft, weapons development | Kinglet | 4.5 kt | Venting detected on site, 1.9 MCi (70 PBq) | | Successful. |
| White | May 25, 1962 15:00:00.15 | PST (-8 hrs) | NTS Area U9b 37.12479°N 116.05287°W | 1,253 m (4,111 ft) - 192.63 m (632.0 ft) | underground shaft, weapons development | Kinglet in XW-58 configuration | 8 kt | Venting detected, 1.6 kCi (59 TBq) | | Similar to Sacramento. |
| Raccoon | June 1, 1962 17:00:00.14 | PST (-8 hrs) | NTS Area U3ajs 37.04556°N 116.03534°W | 1,199 m (3,934 ft) - 164.25 m (538.9 ft) | underground shaft, weapons development | Tsetse in TX-57 configuration | 3 kt | | | Successful, similar to Dormouse, Dormouse Prime, Mink, Fisher, Packrat, HT-I Linden, HT-II Quay. |
| Packrat | June 6, 1962 17:00:00.12 | PST (-8 hrs) | NTS Area U3aw 37.04567°N 116.04015°W | 1,199 m (3,934 ft) - 261.98 m (859.5 ft) | underground shaft, weapons development | Tsetse | 13 kt | I-131 venting detected, 0 | | Successful (see above for similarities), investigated internal initiator to improve safety, increase yield, reduce weight 10 lb (4.5 kg). |
| Des Moines | June 13, 1962 21:00:00.12 | PST (-8 hrs) | NTS Area U12j.01 37.22217°N 116.16301°W | 1,696 m (5,564 ft) - 185.93 m (610.0 ft) | tunnel, weapons development | Kinglet | 2.9 kt | Venting detected off site, 11 MCi (410 PBq) | | similar to Platte. |
| Daman I | June 21, 1962 17:00:00.13 | PST (-8 hrs) | NTS Area U3be 37.04303°N 116.03103°W | 1,197 m (3,927 ft) - 260.4 m (854 ft) | underground shaft, weapons development | | 11 kt | I-131 venting detected, 0 | | Successful. |
| Haymaker | June 27, 1962 18:00:00.12 | PST (-8 hrs) | NTS Area U3au(s) 37.04154°N 116.03612°W | 1,196 m (3,924 ft) - 408.56 m (1,340.4 ft) | underground shaft, weapons development | Moccasin (TX-53 primary) | 67 kt | Venting detected on site, less than 150 Ci (5,600 GBq) | | Possible Mocassin device (tested in Project 58 #2, HT-II Hidalgo). |
| Marshmallow | June 28, 1962 17:00:00.11 | PST (-8 hrs) | NTS Area U16a 37.00906°N 116.20193°W | 2,241 m (7,352 ft) - 310.9 m (1,020 ft) | tunnel, weapon effect | Kinglet | less than 20 kt | Venting detected on site, 35 kCi (1,300 TBq) | | Simulated high altitude effects shot in low pressure chamber, successful, x-ray effects of re-entry vehicles investigated. |
| Sacramento | June 30, 1962 21:30:00.16 | PST (-8 hrs) | NTS Area U9v 37.11737°N 116.04829°W | 1,246 m (4,088 ft) - 149.05 m (489.0 ft) | underground shaft, weapons development | XW-58 | 4 kt | I-131 venting detected, less than 1 kCi (37 TBq) | | similar to White device. |
