= Operation Hardtack II =

Series of 1950s US nuclear tests

- Hardtack II Sanford, 4.9 kilotons.

Information
- Country: United States
- Test site: NTS Area 12, Rainier Mesa; NTS Areas 5, 11, Frenchman Flat; NTS, Areas 1–4, 6–10, Yucca Flat
- Period: 1958
- Number of tests: 37
- Test type: balloon, dry surface, tower, underground shaft, tunnel
- Max. yield: 22 kilotonnes of TNT (92 TJ)

Test series chronology

Operation Hardtack II was a series of 37 nuclear tests conducted by the United States in 1958 at the Nevada Test Site. These tests followed the Operation Argus series and preceded the Operation Nougat series.

With test moratoriums on the horizon, American weapons labs rushed out many new designs. A hard deadline for testing was set at midnight (0000 hrs), 31 October 1958, as negotiations were set to start that day. Twenty-nine tests were executed in October, with four of them on the last day of the month. One test was cancelled because weather delays postponed it across the midnight deadline. After the conclusion of Hardtack II, the United States announced a unilateral testing moratorium, which the Soviet Union joined after two last tests on 1 and 3 November. In September 1961, the Soviet Union resumed nuclear testing — including the test of the most powerful nuclear device ever designed, the Tsar Bomba, in October — and the United States followed suit with Operation Nougat.

== Nuclear tests ==
=== Tamalpais ===
The Tamalpais test was conducted in the U12b.02 adit of Rainier Mesa by Lawrence Radiation Laboratory on October 8, 1958. The shot took place in a 394-foot-long hook-shaped drift ending in an unusually large test chamber lined with salt blocks as part of an experiment in preparation for Project Gnome. Additional experiments included measuring permanent tunnel displacement, seismic ground shock measurement, gas sampling by Oak Ridge National Laboratory, and electromagnetic pulse measurement by the Department of Defense Effects Test Group. The detonation of the .072 kiloton device released significant radioactive contamination and damage to the U12 tunnel complex, with radiation levels of 50R/h at the main portal and in the 10,000 R/h range in the tunnel immediately following detonation. The following day, workers reentered the tunnel and triggered a significant hydrogen gas explosion that further damaged the tunnel and injured three workers. Following the tunnel's evacuation, a second hydrogen explosion occurred later the same day.

=== Adams ===
Adams was planned to be the final test of Hardtack II, but due to unfavorable winds the shot was never fired. The shot was intended to be a balloon test, and had been fully assembled and raised to firing altitude when it was cancelled. After midnight and the start of the moratorium, the device was lowered to the ground and disassembled. The Soviet Union would continue nuclear testing until 3 November.

A 31 October 1958 meeting of the Atomic Energy Commission following the cancellation resulted in the following note:

[General Alfred Starbird] said there will always be a question as to whether the final shot should have been fired in view of its importance [redacted] but he believed that the other considerations were of overriding importance.

During earlier tests in Hardtack II, University of California Radiation Laboratory (UCRL, now Lawrence Livermore National Laboratory) discovered that the planned primary stage for their Polaris nuclear warhead was not one-point safe. The primary was hurriedly redesigned to remedy this issue and was to be tested in Adams.

== List of nuclear tests ==
United States' Hardtack II series tests and detonations
Name (Note: The US, France and Great Britain have code-named their test events, while the USSR and China did not, and therefore have only test numbers (with some exceptions – Soviet peaceful explosions were named). Word translations into English in parentheses unless the name is a proper noun. A dash followed by a number indicates a member of a salvo event. The US also sometimes named the individual explosions in such a salvo test, which results in "name1 – 1(with name2)". If test is canceled or aborted, then the row data like date and location discloses the intended plans, where known.)	Date time (UT)	Local time zone (Note: To convert the UT time into standard local, add the number of hours in parentheses to the UT time; for local daylight saving time, add one additional hour. If the result is earlier than 00:00, add 24 hours and subtract 1 from the day; if it is 24:00 or later, subtract 24 hours and add 1 to the day. Historical time zone data obtained from the IANA time zone database.)	Location (Note: Rough place name and a latitude/longitude reference; for rocket-carried tests, the launch location is specified before the detonation location, if known. Some locations are extremely accurate; others (like airdrops and space blasts) may be quite inaccurate. "~" indicates a likely pro-forma rough location, shared with other tests in that same area.)	Elevation + height (Note: Elevation is the ground level at the point directly below the explosion relative to sea level; height is the additional distance added or subtracted by tower, balloon, shaft, tunnel, air drop or other contrivance. For rocket bursts the ground level is "N/A". In some cases it is not clear if the height is absolute or relative to ground, for example, Plumbbob/John. No number or units indicates the value is unknown, while "0" means zero. Sorting on this column is by elevation and height added together.)	Delivery (Note: Atmospheric, airdrop, balloon, gun, cruise missile, rocket, surface, tower, and barge are all disallowed by the Partial Nuclear Test Ban Treaty. Sealed shaft and tunnel are underground, and remained useful under the PTBT. Intentional cratering tests are borderline; they occurred under the treaty, were sometimes protested, and generally overlooked if the test was declared to be a peaceful use.) Purpose (Note: Include weapons development, weapon effects, safety test, transport safety test, war, science, joint verification and industrial/peaceful, which may be further broken down.)	Device (Note: Designations for test items where known, "?" indicates some uncertainty about the preceding value, nicknames for particular devices in quotes. This category of information is often not officially disclosed.)	Yield (Note: Estimated energy yield in tons, kilotons, and megatons. A ton of TNT equivalent is defined as 4.184 gigajoules (1 gigacalorie).)	Fallout (Note: Radioactive emission to the atmosphere aside from prompt neutrons, where known. The measured species is only iodine-131 if mentioned, otherwise it is all species. No entry means unknown, probably none if underground and "all" if not; otherwise notation for whether measured on the site only or off the site, where known, and the measured amount of radioactivity released.)	References	Notes
Otero	12 September 1958 20:00:00.2	PST (–8 hrs)	NTS Area U3q 37.04985°N 116.03255°W	1,229 m (4,032 ft)–150 m (490 ft)	underground shaft, safety experiment	XW-54 ?	38 t	Venting detected, 6 kCi (220 TBq)		1-point test, failed, device similar to HT-I Sequoia.
Bernalillo	17 September 1958 19:30:00.2	PST (–8 hrs)	NTS Area U3h (n?) 37.04944°N 116.03352°W	1,229 m (4,032 ft)–150 m (490 ft)	underground shaft, safety experiment	XW-54	15 t	Venting detected on site		1-point test, repeat of Otero, also failed.
Eddy	19 September 1958 14:00:00.2	PST (–8 hrs)	NTS Area B7b ~ 37.0866°N 116.0245°W	1,282 m (4,206 ft) + 150 m (490 ft)	balloon, weapons development		83 t	Venting detected, 12 kCi (440 TBq)		154 pounds (70 kg) test device successful.
Luna	21 September 1958 19:00:00.2	PST (–8 hrs)	NTS Area U3m 37.04919°N 116.03447°W	1,230 m (4,040 ft)–150 m (490 ft)	underground shaft, safety experiment	XW-54 ?	1.5 t	Venting detected on site		1-point test, repeat of Otero/Bernalillo, still unsafe.
Mercury	23 September 1958 22:00:00.0	PST (–8 hrs)	NTS Area U12f.01 37.19274°N 116.20024°W	2,038 m (6,686 ft)–55.78 m (183.0 ft)	tunnel, safety experiment	XW-47 primary ?	10 t			1-point test, declared success despite yield, XW-42 test, similar to Pascal-C and San Juan devices.
Valencia	26 September 1958 20:00:00.2	PST (–8 hrs)	NTS Area U3r 37.04956°N 116.03057°W	1,227 m (4,026 ft)–150 m (490 ft)	underground shaft, safety experiment	XW-42 ?	2 t	Venting detected on site		1-point test, declared success despite yield, similar to Pascal-C and San Juan devices.
Mars	28 September 1958 00:00:00.2	PST (–8 hrs)	NTS Area U12f.02 37.19301°N 116.20131°W	2,082 m (6,831 ft)–42.67 m (140.0 ft)	tunnel, safety experiment	XW-48	13 t	Venting detected on site		1-point test, similar to Tamalpais and Ceres.
Mora	29 September 1958 14:05:00.1	PST (–8 hrs)	NTS Area B7b ~ 37.0866°N 116.0245°W	1,282 m (4,206 ft) + 460 m (1,510 ft)	balloon, weapons development	XW-54 Gnat	2 kt	Venting detected, 340 kCi (13,000 TBq)		Full yield test of device similar to Otero et al., fizzled.
Hidalgo	5 October 1958 14:10:00.1	PST (–8 hrs)	NTS Area B7b ~ 37.0866°N 116.0245°W	1,282 m (4,206 ft) + 110 m (360 ft)	balloon, safety experiment	Moccasin	77 t	Venting detected, 11 kCi (410 TBq)		This 1-point test failed; similar to Coulomb-C.
Colfax	5 October 1958 16:15:00.2	PST (–8 hrs)	NTS Area U3k 37.04882°N 116.03491°W	1,229 m (4,032 ft)–107 m (351 ft)	underground shaft, safety experiment	XW-54 Gnat	5.5 t	Venting detected, 240 kCi (8,900 TBq)		1-point test of device similar to Otero et al., failed. Unstemmed shaft.
Tamalpais	8 October 1958 22:00:00.13	PST (–8 hrs)	NTS Area U12b.02 37.19525°N 116.20133°W	2,152 m (7,060 ft)–124.05 m (407.0 ft)	tunnel, weapons development	XW-48	72 t			Full yield test, similar to Mars and Ceres.
Quay	10 October 1958 14:30:00.1	PST (–8 hrs)	NTS Area 7c 37.0947°N 116.0245°W	1,294 m (4,245 ft) + 30 m (98 ft)	tower, weapons development	XW-50 ?	79 t	Venting detected, 200 Ci (7,400 GBq)		Concept feasibility test, similar to HT-I Linden.
Lea	13 October 1958 13:20:00.1	PST (–8 hrs)	NTS Area B7b ~ 37.0866°N 116.0245°W	1,282 m (4,206 ft) + 460 m (1,510 ft)	balloon, weapons development	XW-54 Gnat ?	1.4 kt	Venting detected, 240 kCi (8,900 TBq)		Full yield test of device similar to Otero et al., fizzled.
Neptune	14 October 1958 18:00:00.2	PST (–8 hrs)	NTS Area U12c.03 37.19381°N 116.20057°W	2,080 m (6,820 ft)–30.02 m (98.5 ft)	tunnel, safety experiment	XW-47	115 t	Venting detected on site		1-point test, failed, similar to HT-I Hickory and HT-II Titania. First NTS subsidence crater at Rainier despite low yield and depth buried.
Hamilton	15 October 1958 16:00:00.2	PST (–8 hrs)	NTS Area 5 36.8022°N 115.9331°W	940 m (3,080 ft) + 15 m (49 ft)	tower, weapons development	XW-51 ? Quail	1.2 t	Venting detected, 200 Ci (7,400 GBq)		Davy Crockett prototype test, fizzled, extremely small device (16 kg (35 lb)).
Logan	16 October 1958 06:00:00.14	PST (–8 hrs)	NTS Area A12e.02 37.18399°N 116.20206°W	2,155 m (7,070 ft)–283.58 m (930.4 ft)	tunnel, weapons development		5 kt			ABM warhead test, small (28.6 kg (63 lb), 28 cm × 29 cm (11 in × 11 in)) kiloton-range device, successful.
Dona Ana	16 October 1958 14:20:00.1	PST (–8 hrs)	NTS Area B7b ~ 37.0866°N 116.0245°W	1,282 m (4,206 ft) + 150 m (490 ft)	balloon, weapons development	XW-54 Gnat	37 t	Venting detected, 6 kCi (220 TBq)		Low yield test, similar to Otero et al.
Vesta	17 October 1958 23:00:00.2	PST (–8 hrs)	NTS Area S9e 37.1226°N 116.0347°W	1,294 m (4,245 ft) + 0	dry surface, safety experiment	XW-47 primary	24 t	Venting detected, 4 kCi (150 TBq)		1-point test, failed, similar to Wrangell, Oberon, Sanford.
Rio Arriba	18 October 1958 14:25:00.1	PST (–8 hrs)	NTS Area 3s 37.0411°N 116.0267°W	1,224 m (4,016 ft) + 20 m (66 ft)	tower, weapons development	Mk-7	90 t	Venting detected, 120 kCi (4,400 TBq)		Low yield Mk-7, successful, fired on wooden tower.
San Juan	20 October 1958 14:30:00.2	PST (–8 hrs)	NTS Area U3p 37.04976°N 116.03325°W	1,229 m (4,032 ft)–71 m (233 ft)	underground shaft, safety experiment	XW-42 ?	no yield			1-point test, successful, safe design extrapolated from Pascal-C and HT-II Valencia. Unstemmed shaft.
Socorro	22 October 1958 13:30:00.2	PST (–8 hrs)	NTS Area B7b ~ 37.0866°N 116.0245°W	1,282 m (4,206 ft) + 440 m (1,440 ft)	balloon, weapons development	XW-54 Gnat ?	6 kt	Venting detected, 1,000 kCi (37,000 TBq)		Full yield test of XW-54 primary, successful, similar to Otero et al.
Wrangell	22 October 1958 16:50:00.1	PST (–8 hrs)	NTS Area 5 36.798°N 115.9298°W	940 m (3,080 ft) + 460 m (1,510 ft)	balloon, weapons development	XW-47 Canary ?	115 t	Venting detected, 17 kCi (630 TBq)		Full yield test fizzle, similar to Vesta, Oberon, Sanford.
Oberon	22 October 1958 20:30:??	PST (–8 hrs)	NTS Area 8a 37.1829°N 116.0691°W	1,355 m (4,446 ft) + 8 m (26 ft)	tower, safety experiment	XW-47 primary Canary ?	no yield	Venting detected, 17 kCi (630 TBq)		1-point test, successful, similar to Vesta, Wrangell, Sanford.
Rushmore	22 October 1958 23:40:00.1	PST (–8 hrs)	NTS Area B9a ~ 37.1347°N 116.0417°W	1,285 m (4,216 ft) + 150 m (490 ft)	balloon, weapons development	XW-47 primary Canary ?	188 t			Low yield test, fizzled, similar to Mercury, Neptune, Titania.
Catron	24 October 1958 15:00:00.2	PST (–8 hrs)	NTS Area 3t 37.0427°N 116.0277°W	1,225 m (4,019 ft) + 20 m (66 ft)	tower, safety experiment	XW-54 Gnat	21 t	Venting detected, 4 kCi (150 TBq)		1-point test, similar to Mora, failed, fired on wooden tower.
Juno	24 October 1958 16:01:00.2	PST (–8 hrs)	NTS Area S9f 37.12361°N 116.03776°W	1,287 m (4,222 ft) + 0	dry surface, safety experiment	Logan	1.7 t			1-point test to determine safety limits.
Ceres	26 October 1958 04:00:00.2	PST (–8 hrs)	NTS Area 8b 37.1814°N 116.0691°W	1,350 m (4,430 ft) + 10 m (33 ft)	tower, safety experiment	XW-48 AFAP	700 kg			1-point test of atomic artillery shell, similar to Tamalpais and Mars.
Sanford	26 October 1958 10:20:00.1	PST (–8 hrs)	NTS Area 5 36.798°N 115.9298°W	940 m (3,080 ft) + 460 m (1,510 ft)	balloon, weapons development	XW-47 primary Canary ?	4.9 kt	Venting detected, 750 kCi (28,000 TBq)		Full yield test, successful, similar to Vesta, Oberon, Wrangell.
De Baca	26 October 1958 16:00:00.1	PST (–8 hrs)	NTS Area B7b ~ 37.0866°N 116.0245°W	1,282 m (4,206 ft) + 460 m (1,510 ft)	balloon, weapons development	XW-54 Gnat	2.2 kt	Venting detected, 380 kCi (14,000 TBq)		Full yield test, disappointing yield, similar to Catron and Mora.
Chavez	27 October 1958 14:30:??	PST (–8 hrs)	NTS Area 3u 37.0443°N 116.0305°W	1,225 m (4,019 ft) + 16 m (52 ft)	tower, safety experiment	XW-54 Gnat	600 kg	Venting detected, 100 Ci (3,700 GBq)		1-point test of device similar to De Baca, failed, fired on wooden tower.
Evans	29 October 1958 00:00:00.15	PST (–8 hrs)	NTS Area U12b.04 37.19477°N 116.20563°W	2,282 m (7,487 ft)–256.03 m (840.0 ft)	tunnel, weapons development	XW-47 primary Canary ?	55 t	Venting detected on site		Full yield test fizzle, similar to Blanca.
Mazama	29 October 1958 11:20:??	PST (–8 hrs)	NTS Area 9 37.12648°N 116.04196°W	1,282 m (4,206 ft) + 15 m (49 ft)	tower, weapons development		no yield			Fizzle.
Humboldt	29 October 1958 14:45:00.1	PST (–8 hrs)	NTS Area 3v 37.0477°N 116.0256°W	1,228 m (4,029 ft) + 10 m (33 ft)	tower, weapons development	XW-51 ?	7.8 t	Venting detected, 1 kCi (37 TBq)		Repeat of Hamilton with higher yield, extremely small device (16 kg).
Santa Fe	30 October 1958 03:00:00.1	PST (–8 hrs)	NTS Area B7b ~ 37.0866°N 116.0245°W	1,282 m (4,206 ft) + 460 m (1,510 ft)	balloon, weapons development	XW-54 Gnat	1.3 kt	Venting detected, 220 kCi (8,100 TBq)		Similar to devices fired in many preceding shots, yield below predictions.
Ganymede	30 October 1958 11:00:??	PST (–8 hrs)	NTS Area S9g 37.123°N 116.035°W	1,294 m (4,245 ft) + 0	dry surface, safety experiment	W-45	no yield			1-point test of W-45/Swan variant, successful.
Blanca	30 October 1958 15:00:00.15	PST (–8 hrs)	NTS Area U12e.05 37.18589°N 116.20289°W	2,168 m (7,113 ft)–254.51 m (835.0 ft)	tunnel, weapons development	XW-47 primary Canary	22 kt	Venting detected, 510 Ci (19,000 GBq)		Test of alternate W-47 primary in TN mockup, successful, similar to Evans, shot vented to atmosphere through the side of the mesa.
Titania	30 October 1958 20:34:00.2	PST (–8 hrs)	NTS Area 8c 37.1773°N 116.0699°W	1,343 m (4,406 ft) + 10 m (33 ft)	tower, safety experiment	XW-47 primary Canary	200 kg			1-point test of original XW-47 primary, declared safe despite yield, similar to HT-I Hickory and HT-II Neptune.
Adams (canceled)	31 October 1958	PST (–8 hrs)	NTS ~ 37.044°N 116.068°W	1,220 m (4,000 ft) + ???	Balloon, weapons development		unknown yield			Test planned for Hardtack II, but held up by atmospherics that would have shattered windows in Las Vegas, and could not be completed in time before start of moratorium negotiations.
