= Starling (nuclear primary) =

American nuclear bomb

The Starling was a small American nuclear bomb developed in the 1950s that was used as the primary in several US thermonuclear weapons.

The Starling was developed by Lawrence Livermore National Laboratory. According to researcher Chuck Hansen, it was 11.53 inches (293 mm) in diameter, 14.25 inches (362 mm) in length, and had a weight of 86.4 pounds (39.2 kg). As tested in Nougat Cimarron, the primary had a yield of 5 to 8 kilotonnes of TNT (21 to 33 TJ) but is also described as being 10 to 20 kilotonnes of TNT (42 to 84 TJ). It was a two-point primary, like Tsetse, Kinglet, Robin, and Gnat.

Starling is reportedly the primary for the W55 (which also used Kinglet) and W56 warheads. Starling and Kinglet are reportedly the immediate successors to Robin.

== See also ==
- List of nuclear weapons
- Teller-Ulam design
