= Hardtack (disambiguation) =

Hardtack is a simple type of biscuit or cracker.

Hardtack or Hard Tack may also refer to:

- Hardtack (game), a miniature wargame ruleset
- Hard Tack (horse) (1926–1947), an American Thoroughbred racehorse
- Hardtack Island, in Portland, Oregon, United States

== See also ==
- Operation Hardtack (disambiguation)
