= UUM-44 SUBROC =

United States Navy nuclear warhead anti-submarine rocket (1964–1989)

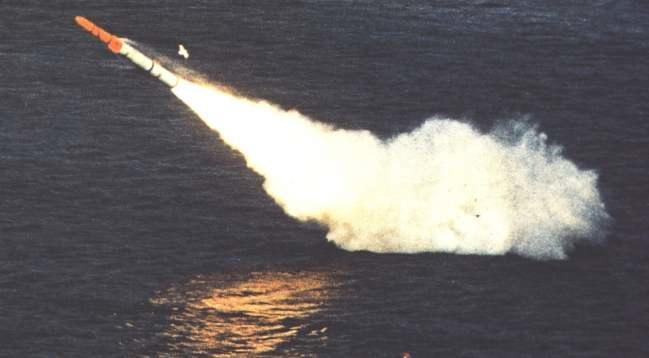
- A UUM-44 Subroc after leaving the water.
- Type: Standoff anti-submarine weapon
- Place of origin: United States

Service history
- In service: 1964–1989
- Used by: United States Navy

Production history
- Manufacturer: Goodyear Aerospace

Specifications
- Mass: 4,000 lb (1,800 kg)
- Length: 22 ft (6.7 m)
- Diameter: 21 in (53 cm)
- Warhead: Disputed, either 1 to 5 kilotonnes of TNT (4.2 to 20.9 TJ) or 25 kilotonnes of TNT (100 TJ)
- Detonation mechanism: Depth Fuze
- Engine: Solid rocket booster
- Operational range: 55 km (34 mi)
- Maximum speed: subsonic
- Guidance system: Inertial guidance ballistic trajectory
- Launch platform: Submarine

The UUM-44 SUBROC ("Submarine Rocket") was a type of submarine-launched rocket deployed by the United States Navy as an anti-submarine weapon. It carried a 25 kiloton tactical nuclear warhead configured as a nuclear depth bomb.

== Development ==
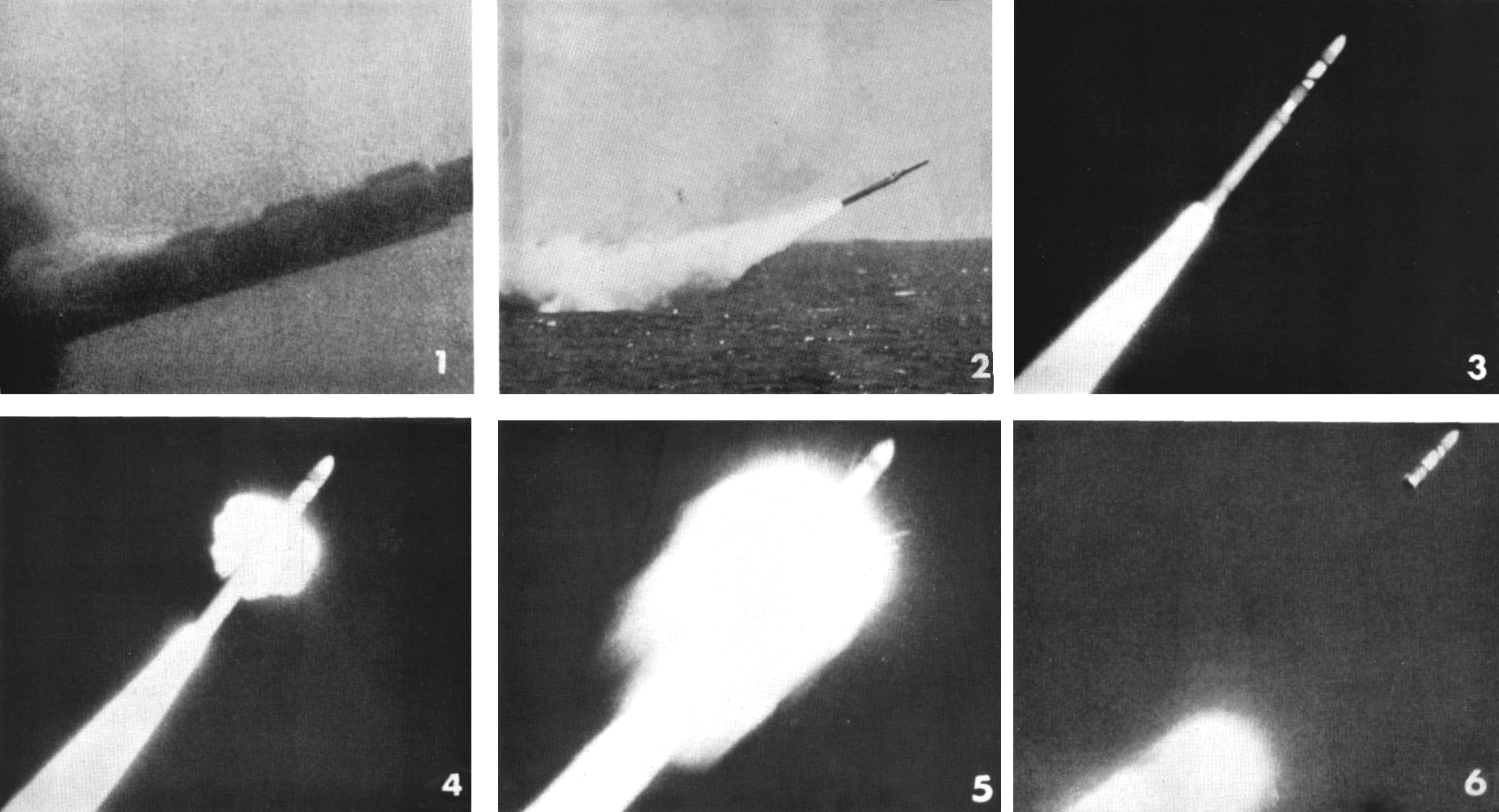
Subroc launch sequence, 1964.

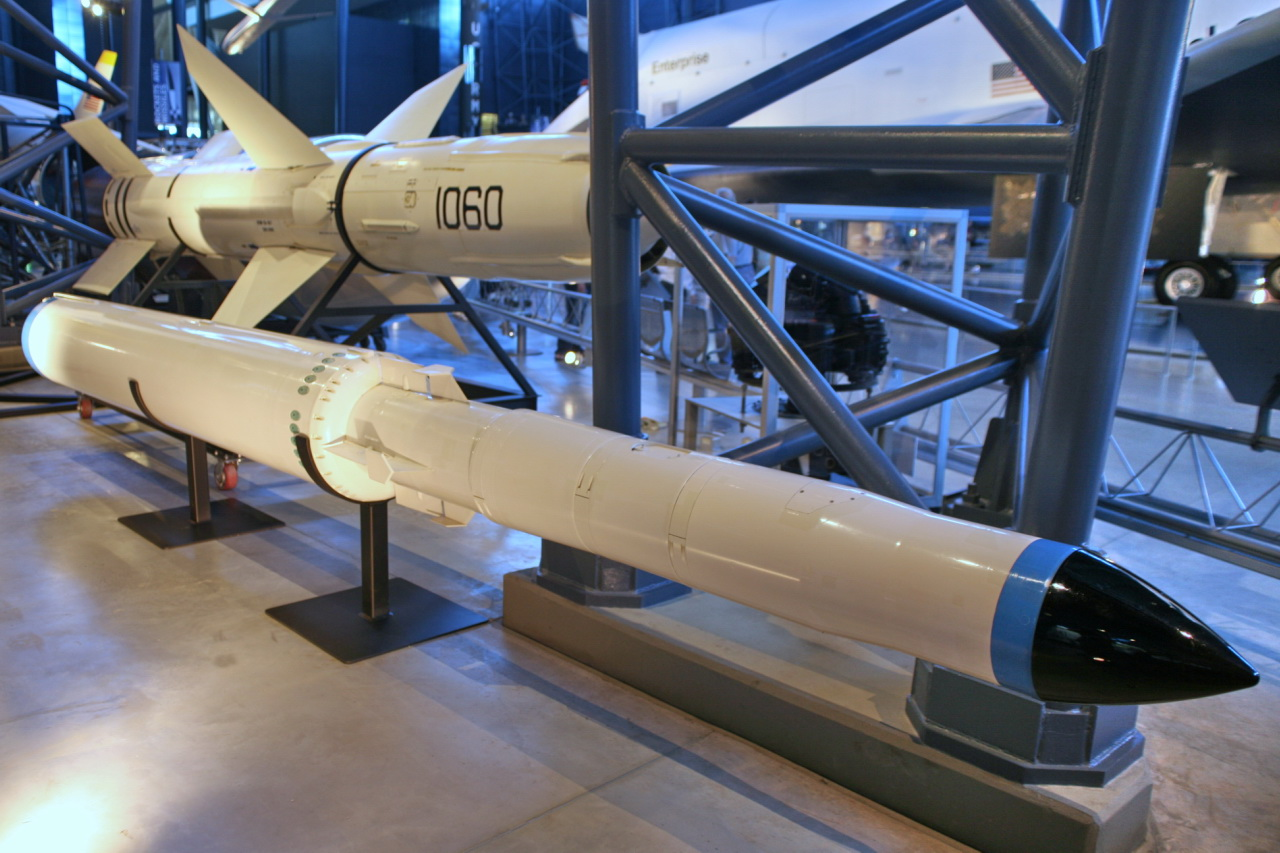
Subroc in Steven F. Udvar-Hazy Center

SUBROC was one of several weapons recommended for implementation by Project Nobska, a 1956 summer study on submarine warfare. Development began in 1958, with the technical evaluation being completed in 1963. SUBROC reached Initial Operation Capability (IOC) aboard the attack submarine Permit in 1964. When SUBROC reached IOC, the US Navy's admiral in charge of weapons procurement stated that SUBROC was "…a more difficult technical problem than Polaris."

== Operation ==
SUBROC could be launched from a 21-inch submarine torpedo tube. After launch, the solid fuel rocket motor fired and SUBROC rose to the surface. The attitude then changed and SUBROC flew to its destination following a predetermined ballistic trajectory. At a predetermined time in the trajectory, the reentry vehicle (containing the warhead) separated from the solid fuel motor. The low kiloton (Note: The yield of this weapon remains classified. Public sources have given yields from 5 to 250 kilotonnes of TNT (21 to 1,046 TJ)) W55 nuclear depth bomb dropped into the water and sank rapidly to detonate near its target. A direct hit was not necessary.

The W55 was 13 inches (33 cm) in diameter, 39.4 inches (100 cm) long, and weighed 465 lb (211 kg). Some sources suggest the W55 evolved from the experimental bomb tested in the Hardtack I Olive nuclear test on July 22, 1958, which had a full two-stage yield estimated at 202 kilotons. Researcher Chuck Hansen claims based on his US nuclear program research that the W55 and W58 warheads shared a common primary or fission first stage named Kinglet.

SUBROC's tactical use was as an urgent-attack long-range weapon for time-urgent submarine targets that could not be attacked with any other weapon without betraying the position of the launching submarine by calling for an air-strike, or where the target was too distant to be attacked quickly with a torpedo launched from the submarine. The tactical rationale for SUBROC was similar to that for ASROC or Ikara. An added advantage was that SUBROC's approach to the target was not detectable by the target in time to take evasive action, although the warhead yield would appear to make evasive maneuvers unrealistic. However, SUBROC was less flexible in its use than Ikara or ASROC: since its only payload was a nuclear warhead, it could not be used to provide stand-off fire in a conventional (i.e., non-nuclear) engagement.

SUBROC production ended in 1968. SUBROC was never used in combat, and all 285 W55 warheads were decommissioned in 1990 following the end of the Cold War. Because the nuclear warhead was an integral part of the weapon, SUBROC could not be exported to other navies, and there is no evidence that any were supplied to other NATO allies under the well-established arrangements for supplying other dual-key nuclear weapons. In 1980 a planned successor, the UUM-125 Sea Lance, was authorized. In 1982 the contract was awarded to Boeing. The system and its W89 warhead were cancelled in 1990 at the end of the Cold War.

== See also ==
- List of nuclear weapons
- RUR-5 ASROC – (United States)
- RUM-139 VL-ASROC – (United States)
- Ikara (missile) – (Australia)
- RPK-2 Viyuga – (Soviet Union)
- Sea Lance – (United States)
