= Kinglet (nuclear primary) =

American nuclear weapon component

Kinglet was a boosted fission primary used in several American thermonuclear weapons.

The W55 warhead for the UUM-44 SUBROC anti-submarine missile and the W58 warhead for Polaris A-3 were designed to use Kinglet, while the W47 warhead for Polaris A-1/A-2 were retrofitted with Kinglet to overcome the technical issues with the Robin primary the W47 was initially deployed with. Allegedly, only the W47Y2 (Note: The Y2 nomenclature indicates the high-yield 1,200 kilotonnes of TNT (5,000 TJ) version of the warhead. The W47Y1 was 600 kilotonnes of TNT (2,500 TJ).) was converted to the Mod 3 design using Kinglet.

== Design ==
The Kinglet device was approximately 11.2–11.57 inches (284–294 mm) in diameter, 11.5–12.2 inches (290–310 mm) in length and weighed approximately 58–63 pounds (26–29 kg).

The device was of the two-point design. Two-point devices only require two detonators to fire the whole device, compared to earlier nuclear weapons that required tens of detonators.

Characteristics of the warheads that used Kinglet are:

Kinglet primary based nuclear weapons
Warhead	Max Yield	Diameter	Length	Weight
W47Y2 Mod 3	1,200 kilotonnes of TNT (5,000 TJ)	457 mm (18 in)	1,194 mm (47 in)	332 kg (733 lb)
W55	5 kilotonnes of TNT (21 TJ) (Note: Some sources give the yield as 5 kilotonnes of TNT (21 TJ), but also describe it as being a "mid-kiloton weapon" and based on the same 200 kilotonnes of TNT (840 TJ) Hardtack Olive device that became the W58 warhead.)	343 mm (13.5 in)	1,001 mm (39.4 in)	213 kg (470 lb)
W58	200 kilotonnes of TNT (840 TJ)	396 mm (15.6 in)	1,016 mm (40 in)	117 kg (257 lb)

== See also ==
- List of nuclear weapons
- Teller-Ulam design
- Tsetse primary
- Python primary

== Bibliography ==
- Beware the old story by Chuck Hansen, Bulletin of the Atomic Scientists, March/April 2001 pp. 52-55 (vol. 57, no. 02)
- http://nuclearweaponarchive.org/Usa/Weapons?Allbombs.html
- The History of the UK. Strategic Deterrent: The Chevaline Programme. ISBN 1-85768-109-6 Published:2004 by the Royal Aeronautical Society, London.
