= Operation Hardtack =

Operation Hardtack can refer to:

- Operation Hardtack (commando raid), a Second World War British commando raid
- Operation Hardtack I, a series of nuclear weapon test carried out in the Pacific during 1958.
- Operation Hardtack II, a series of nuclear weapon tests carried out at the Nevada Test Site during 1958.
