= AGM-62 Walleye =

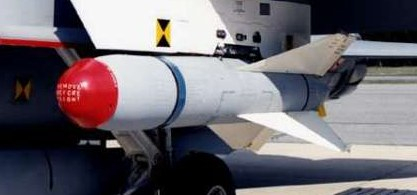
- AGM-62 Walleye loaded onboard an aircraft.
- Type: Guided glide bomb
- Place of origin: United States

Service history
- In service: 1967–1990s
- Used by: United States Armed Forces
- Wars: Vietnam War; Gulf War

Production history
- Manufacturer: Martin Marietta
- Variants: Guided Weapon Mk 1 Mod 0; Guided Weapon Mk 2; Guided Weapon Mk 3; Guided Weapon Mk 4; Guided Weapon Mk 5; Guided Weapon Mk 6

Specifications
- Warhead: High-explosive or W72 nuclear warhead
- Warhead weight: 825 lb (374 kg)
- Launch platform: Douglas A-4 Skyhawk; Grumman A-6 Intruder; LTV A-7 Corsair II; McDonnell Douglas F-4 Phantom II; McDonnell Douglas F/A-18 Hornet

The AGM-62 Walleye is a television-guided glide bomb which was produced by Martin Marietta and used by the United States Armed Forces from the 1960s-1990s. The Walleye I had a 825 lb (374 kg) high-explosive warhead; the later Walleye II "Fat Albert" version had a 2,000 pound warhead and the ability for that to be replaced with a W72 nuclear warhead.

The AGM designation of the Walleye as an "air-to-ground missile" is a misnomer, as it is an unpowered bomb with guidance avionics, similar to the more modern GBU-15. The Walleye was superseded by the AGM-65 Maverick, which did include a rocket motor and was thus a missile.

== History ==
The Walleye was the first of a family of precision-guided munitions designed to hit targets with minimal collateral damage. This "smart bomb" had no propulsion system, but it could be maneuvered via a television guidance system during its glide from an aircraft to the target. As a pilot dived towards a target, a television camera in the nose of the bomb transmitted images to a monitor in the cockpit. Once the pilot acquired a sharp image of the target on his screen, he designated an aim point and released the bomb, which would continue flying toward the designated target on its own. The bomb was a true fire-and-forget system because once launched, the plane could immediately turn away from the aim point. The Walleye maneuvered itself using four large fins. Later versions employed an extended range data link that let pilots keep flying the weapon after its release, and even change aim points during flight (command guidance).

The idea of a TV guided bomb came out of discussions between an eclectic group of civilian engineers at the Naval Ordnance Test Center (later the Naval Weapons Center) at China Lake, California. One of the engineers, Norman Kay, built televisions in his home as a hobby. Kay built an iconoscope camera in 1958 that could do a "funny thing", recalled fellow project engineer William H. Woodworth. "It occurred to him that he could build a little circuit into there that would put a little blip in the picture, and he could make the little blip track things that would move in the picture". The two engineers, soon joined by Dave Livingston, Jack Crawford, George Lewis, Larry Brown, Steve Brugler, Bob (Sam) Cunningham and several others, decided to research the idea further and quickly secured some seed money from the Navy to advance the concept. Adopting some technology from the AIM-9 Sidewinder air-to-air missile project and developing other components from scratch, the group developed the bomb in just four years. Among other revolutionary breakthroughs, the group developed the world's first solid-state television camera with no vacuum tubes and the first zero-input-impedance amplifier.

The team worked at nights and on weekends to keep the project on track and convince the Navy of its worth. Woodworth was the electronics expert and went so far as to take a year off from work and attend graduate school at his own expense to gain some additional theoretical knowledge needed for the project. Woodworth and Steve Brugler breadboarded the original tracking circuitry. Brugler then did the detailed analysis and design of the tracker for initial production. Larry Brown worked tirelessly to analyze the bomb's flight traits, using an analog-computing instrument. Jack Crawford had an amazing "intuitive feel for physical phenomena", and could envision many of the flying traits of the bomb before it had even been built.

== First test and production contract ==
On 29 January 1963, a YA-4B Skyhawk flown by Commander J. A. Sickel, dropped the first Walleye at China Lake. The bomb scored a direct hit. Martin received the first production contract for the Walleye in 1966 and the bomb entered service with both the Navy and the U.S. Air Force the following year. The original Walleye I carried a 1,100-pound shaped charge and had a range of 16 nautical miles (30 km).

In 1966, the AGM-62 designation was cancelled, the decision having been made not to designate guided bombs in the missile sequence; the AGM-62A was given the new designation Guided Weapon Mk 1 Mod 0, while its training version was Mk 2. Mk 3 was the Walleye ER, featuring extended wings to increase range, while the Mk 4 was also a training round.

== Use during Vietnam War ==
By May 1967, Navy pilots had dropped several bombs in Vietnam with great success. On 19 May 1967, Ho Chi Minh's 77th birthday, a Navy aircraft from the USS Bon Homme Richard scored a direct hit against the Hanoi power plant with a Walleye. The Navy hit the plant again with the bomb two days later, knocking out Hanoi's major source of power.

While softer targets such as power plants proved quite vulnerable to the Walleye, sturdier ones such as North Vietnam's well-constructed railroad bridges could not be downed even with a 1,100-pound weapon. Direct hits by the Walleye against the Thanh Hoa Bridge south of Hanoi in 1967 failed to take down even a single span of this notoriously strong structure.

== Walleye II, "Fat Albert" ==
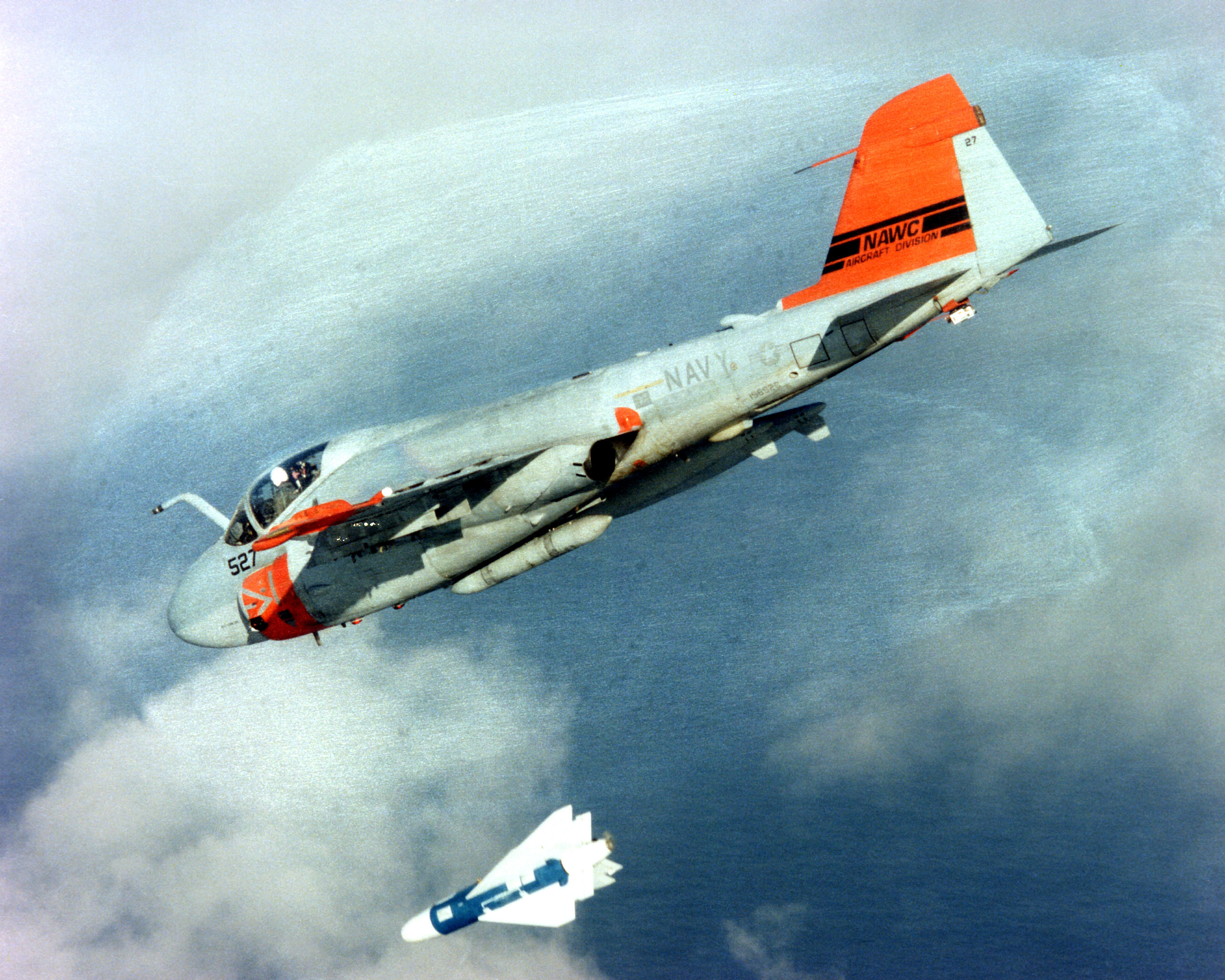
An A-6E SWIP Intruder releasing a Walleye II during testing at NAWC Pax River, 1994.

To correct this major deficiency, China Lake developed a 2,000-pound version of the bomb, and deployed it to Vietnam in time for President Richard Nixon's Linebacker raids against Hanoi and Haiphong. The new Walleye II, or "Fat Albert" as it was nicknamed after the cartoon character, officially designated Guided Weapon Mk 5, had an extended range data link and could hit targets up to 45 nautical miles (83 km) from its launch point. On 27 April 1972, a flight of eight Air Force fighters, two carrying 2000-pound laser-guided bombs and two carrying Walleye IIs, attacked the Thanh Hoa Bridge. Cloud cover prevented the LGBs from being used, but five of the Walleyes locked on, causing heavy damage to the bridge, despite failing to bring down a span. On 13 May, the Air Force finally brought down the bridge with 3,000 and 2,000-pound laser-guided bombs. The North Vietnamese, however, soon repaired the bridge, compelling the Navy and Air Force to fly 13 more missions against the target. On one such mission on 23 October, four VA-82 and VA-86 A-7C Corsair II pilots from the carrier USS America took down the bridge with a combination of Walleye IIs and conventional 2000-pound bombs.

Mark 6 was a nuclear-armed variant of the Walleye II. The weapon carried a W72 warhead with an estimated yield of around 600 tons of TNT. These warheads were remanufactured from retired W54 warheads. The warheads were retired in 1979.

== Use in the 1991 Gulf War ==
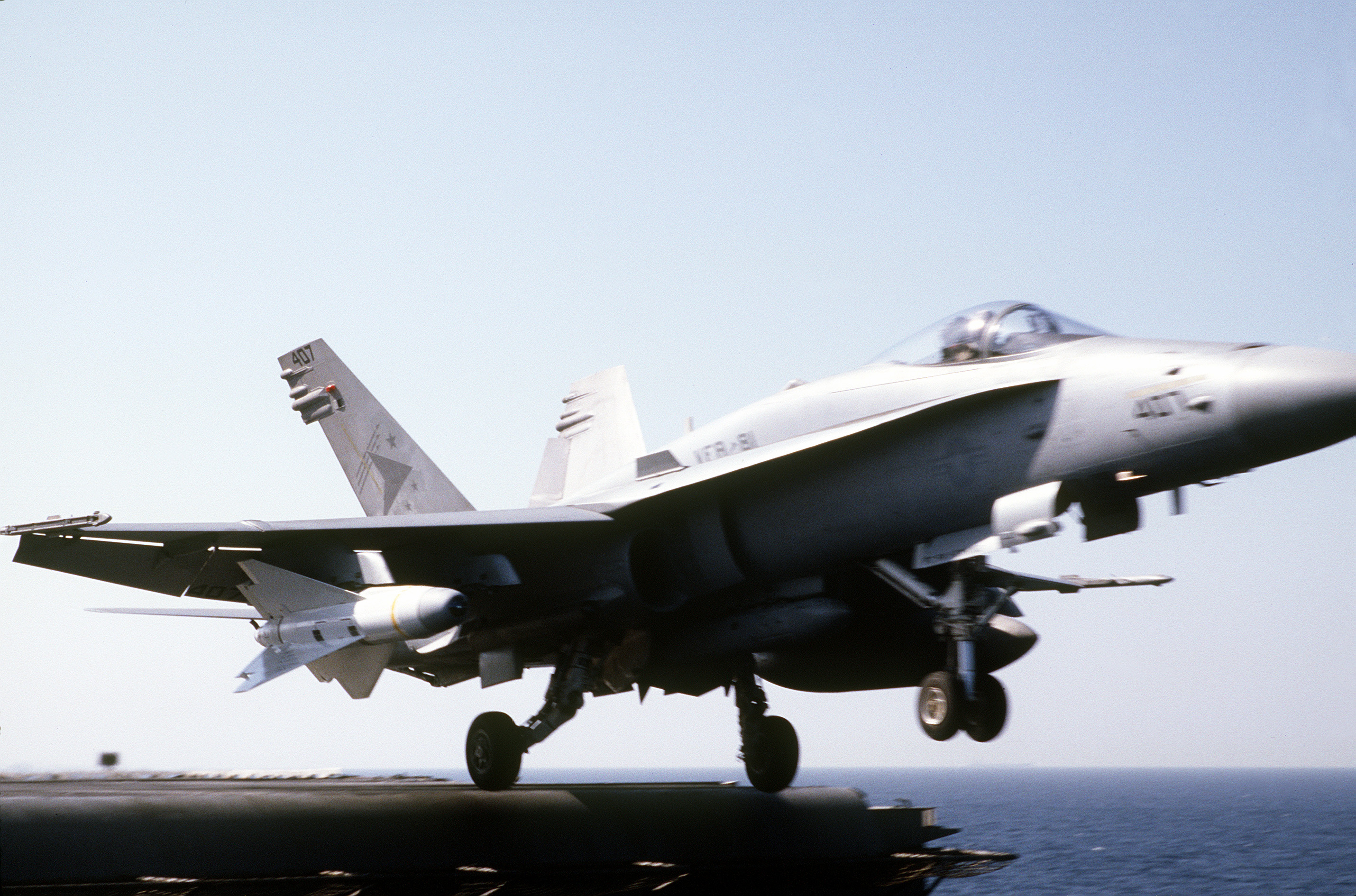
AA407, an F/A-18C from VFA-81 carrying an AGM-62B Walleye II on 1 February 1991 during Desert Storm.

After the war, the Navy continued to employ upgraded versions of the Walleye. By January 1991 when Operation Desert Storm began, several Navy squadrons deployed with the Walleye. During a strike on Umm Qasr in January 1991 (possibly the 24th), VFA-195 became the first Hornet squadron to drop a Walleye in combat when LCDR. Jeffery S. Ashby flying an F/A-18A Hornet used a Walleye II to destroy a T-shaped building at the Iraqi Naval Base at Umm Qasr.

Another unique mission was when on 13 February 1991, Ashby and another F/A-18A destroyed an Iraqi Super Frelon helicopter armed with Exocets on the ground with a Walleye I. The aircraft that flew on that mission, (NF-104) was then painted with a kill marking of the Super Frelon and displayed at the squadron's air wing (CVW-5) home base at NAF Atsugi in 1991. By the end of the Gulf War, between 124 and 130 Walleyes (many from older production runs) had been launched exclusively by the US Navy with the weapon performing well.

Shortly after the war, the Walleye was retired, along with its main carrier aircraft, the A-7 Corsair II.

== Variants ==
=== Walleye I ===
- Also known as the AGM-62A Walleye I, this was the first version used. Had a 825 Ib warhead.

=== Walleye II ===
- Also known as the AGM-62B Walleye II, designed as an improvement to the Walleye I due to ineffectiveness to take out large targets like bridges and nicknamed 'Fat Albert'. Had a 2,000 Ib warhead.

=== Walleye I ERDL/II ERDL ===
- The Extended Range Datalink (ERDL) upgrade in 1975 which added the addition of AN/AWW-9 and later AN/AAW-13 datalink pod to allow the use of the Walleye beyond visual range, allowing the pilot to also turn away from the target area. The Walleye II ERDL also had slightly larger fins. Production ended in 1976.

=== Walleye I ERDL/II ERDL Phase I ===
- Upgrading of the datalink equipment for the Walleye.

== See also ==
Related lists

- List of military aircraft of the United States
- List of missiles

== Bibliography ==
- Bonds, Ray and David Miller (5 August 2002). "AIM-9 Sidewinder". Illustrated Directory of Modern American Weapons. Zenith Imprint, 2002. ISBN 0-7603-1346-6.
