= W58 =

W58 nuclear warhead
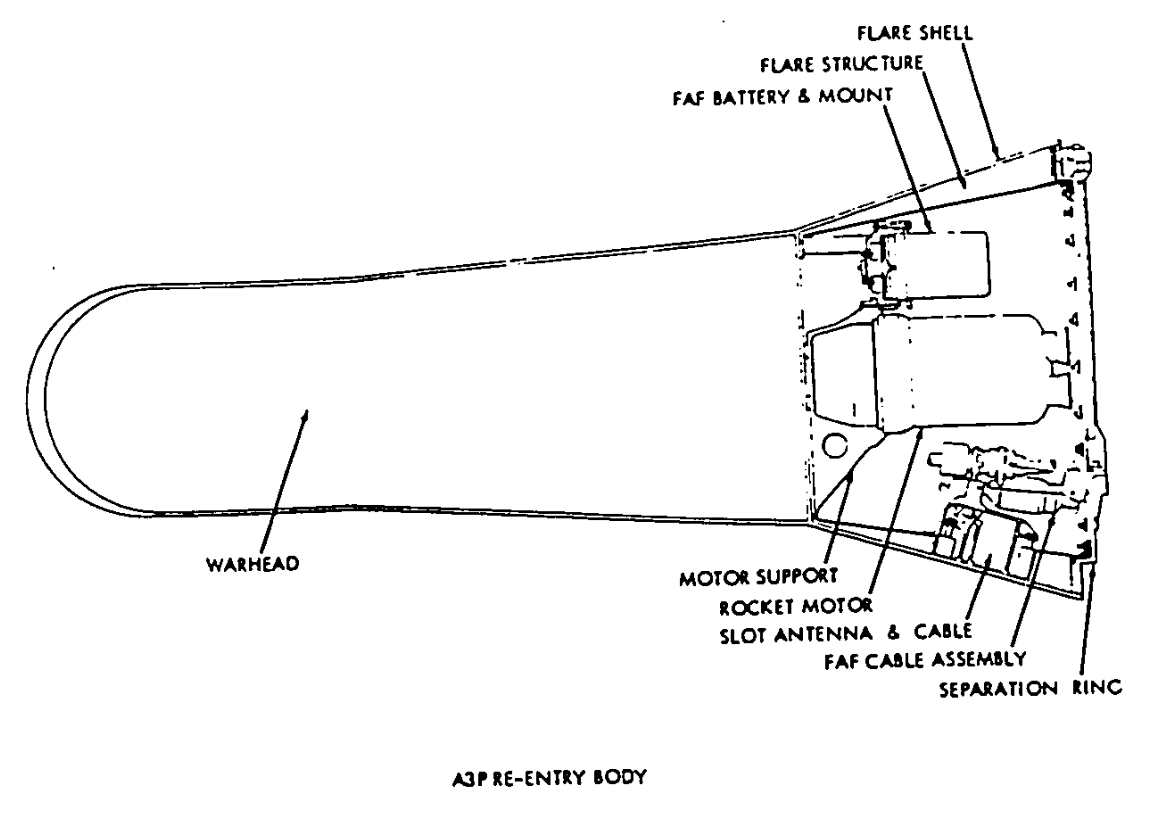
- Diagram of the Mark 2 Reentry Body that housed the W58 thermonuclear warhead
- Type: Nuclear weapon
- Place of origin: United States

Production history
- Designer: Lawrence Livermore National Laboratory
- Designed: 1960 to 1964
- Produced: March 1964 to June 1967
- No. built: 1400
- Variants: 2

Specifications
- Mass: 257 lb (117 kg)
- Length: 40.3 inches (102 cm)
- Diameter: 15.6 in (40 cm)
- Blast yield: 200 kilotonnes of TNT (840 TJ)

The W58 was an American thermonuclear warhead used on the Polaris A-3 submarine-launched ballistic missile. Three W58 warheads were fitted as multiple warheads on each Polaris A-3 missile.

The W58 was 15.6 inches (400 mm) in diameter and 40.3 inches (1,020 mm) long, and weighed 257 pounds (117 kg). The yield was 200 kilotonnes of TNT (840 TJ). The warhead used the Kinglet primary, which it shared with the W55 and W47 warheads.

The W58 design entered service in 1964 and the last models were retired in 1982 with the last Polaris missiles.

== History ==
The W58 program began in mid-1959 when concerns were raised that enemy defensive capability was increasing due to improved detection capabilities. A study into the problem was conducted and its report released in August 1959 which recommended the development of a cluster warhead system for missile. In November 1959, a follow-up study into the feasibility of a cluster warhead for the Polaris missile began and its report was submitted in January 1960. The report recommended the development of a missile carrying three warheads, mounted on an ejection system to disperse the warheads. The warheads would be released at approximately 200,000 feet (61,000 m) altitude. A protective fairing would protect the warheads during the underwater launch and early flight of the missile.

Two reentry bodies were initially considered. Both were the same basic, slightly flared cylinder, but one had a hemispherical nose made of pyrolytic graphite, and the other an elliptical nose made of either pyrolytic graphite or beryllium. Both designs had an inner wall temperature of 1,500 °F (820 °C) with insulation limiting the warhead temperature to 300 °F (149 °C). A hemispherical shape was eventually chosen.

In July 1960, it was decided that both airburst and surfaceburst fuzing would be provided. Airburst fuzing would be the inertial type, consisting of a range-corrected timer started by a decelerometer. The airburst fuze would be suitable for 95% of the target types envisioned for Polaris, while the remaining targets would be at too high an altitude for the airburst fuze and instead would be destroyed using the surfaceburst fuze. The ability to select surface burst for any target was also included.

The primary safing device was to be a decelerometer that required 10 g (98 m/s^{2}) deceleration for five seconds to actuate. An interlock device to prevent arming of the warhead if it did not separate from the missile was also included. The thermal battery that supplied power to the weapon was designed to actuate when exposed to reentry heating.

Formal approval to develop the warhead was given in July 1960 and the military characteristics approved in August of that year. Lawrence Radiation Laboratory (now Lawrence Livermore National Laboratory) was assigned the warhead, and while the lab's workload was quite heavy at the time, it was believed that the four year development program envisaged (as opposed to the originally envisaged three-year program) would mean that compensatory reductions in other programs would not be needed.

The nomenclature of XW-59 was initially assigned to the weapon, but in October 1960 the weapon was reassigned the nomenclature XW-58 (The XW-58 nomenclature was initially assigned to the Special Atomic Demolition Munition version of the W54 warhead). The department of defense was responsible for all aspects of the weapon except for the warhead itself. Lockheed Missiles and Space Division were assigned development of the reentry body, missile and testing equipment, while the Naval Ordnance Laboratory developed the fuzing and firing system. A flight test program consisting of 14 tests was scheduled for October 1962. Early production was planned for January 1964, with a planned operational availability date of June 1964.

The fuzing system would contain a barometric airburst fuze with three height of burst options, and a surfaceburst fuze. The firing system would be of the explosive-electric transducer type, the warhead would be sealed, and the boosting gas reservoir would be contained in a well that allowed for removal and replacement without breaking the warhead seal. Magnesium instead of titanium was selected for the support casing in March 1961 as it offered minimum weight, ease of machining and moderate resistance to high temperatures. A protective can for the radiation case was provided as no means of sufficiently protecting the radiation case from the environment was known. The explosive-electric transducer was later substituted for a ferromagnetic transducer as the technology had not yet sufficiently advanced.

In August 1961, the proposed ordnance characteristics of the warhead were found to be satisfactory to the Navy. The warhead with reentry body was 23.5 inches (600 mm) wide at the flare, 54 inches (1,400 mm) long and weighed 300 pounds (140 kg). The weapon consisted of a warhead, integrated fuzing and firing system and an outer heat shield surrounding the weapon. The planned pyrolytic graphite was substituted for an ablative heat shield integrated into the warhead structure. The reentry body was known as the Mark 2.

In March 1962, a warhead redesign occurred, leading to the redesigned warhead nomenclature of XW-58-X1. This redesign included close integration of warhead components, including integration of warhead casing with the heat shield and consolidation of the fuzing and firing system into a single unit. This redesign caused the design release date to slip by three months. The Mk 58 Mod 0 was designed released in May 1963, with the exception of the reentry body and primary stage.

In June 1963, the primary stage was replaced following an interim review. The new primary eliminated the mechanical safing system which the navy had expressed vulnerability concerns about. Early production of the Mk 58 Mod 1 warhead began in March 1964 and the first submarine equipped with the warheads was on station in October 1964.

The Mk 58 Mod 2 was proposed in December 1965 to provide resistance to high energy x-rays, but the program was never authorized.

In approximately 1975, corrosion problems were discovered in some W58 warheads. The problem was evaluated with computer modelling rather than nuclear testing. The modelling determined that the problem could be overcome with some minor changes to weapon maintenance. However, the actions taken may have been influenced by the planned retirement date for the weapon.

The warhead was retired in April 1982.

== Design ==
The final warhead consisted of a magnesium case with an aluminium cover. The nylon-phenolic heat shield was bonded to the magnesium case. The warhead cover included two ports for target detecting radar antennas, a baroport for pressure information and a valve to fill the warhead with dry air. The fuze was a single-channel device. The thermal battery and radar antennas were mounted on the warhead flare section. Airburst fuzing was controlled by a timer and baroswitch, with three height of burst options, while surfaceburst fuzing was provided by an electronic radiating type device.

The firing set was of the dual-channel type and the weapon used an external neutron generator. The nuclear system was designed to produce no more than 4 pounds (1.8 kg) yield in the event of a detonation by anything other than the firing system. The safing system included acceleration actuated contacts that closed approximately 55 seconds after launch, at an altitude of 65,000 feet (20,000 m), which connected the warhead electrical system to the thermal battery and programmer.

The warhead used the Kinglet nuclear primary. Weapon yield was 200 kilotonnes of TNT (840 TJ).

The warhead with reentry body was 23.5 inches (600 mm) wide at the flare, 54 inches (1,400 mm) long and weighed 300 pounds (140 kg). The warhead without RB was 15.6 inches (400 mm) in diameter and 40.3 inches (1,020 mm) long, and weighed 257 pounds (117 kg).

== See also ==
- List of nuclear weapons
- W47
- Kinglet (nuclear primary)
