= W54 =

Nuclear warhead used by the US

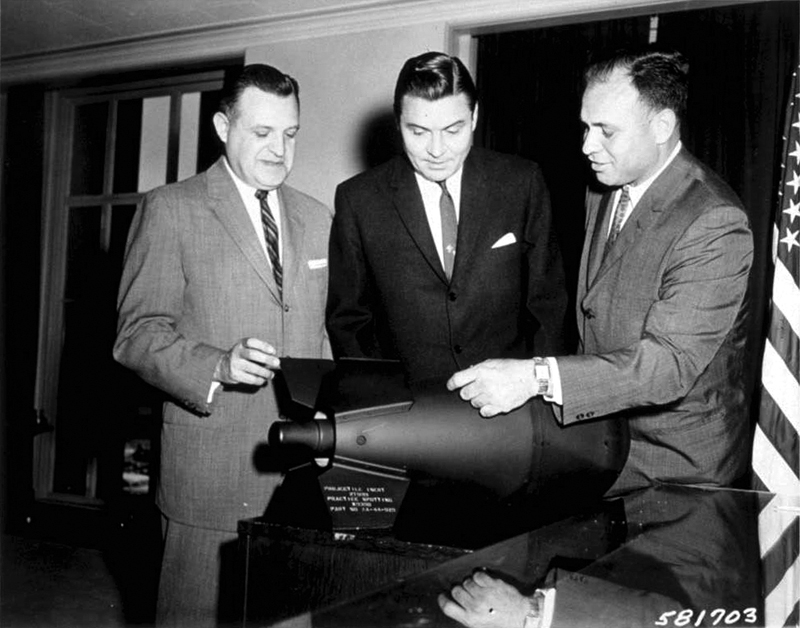
The W54 nuclear warhead was used in the man-portable M-388 Davy Crockett projectile. The unusually small size of the warhead is apparent.

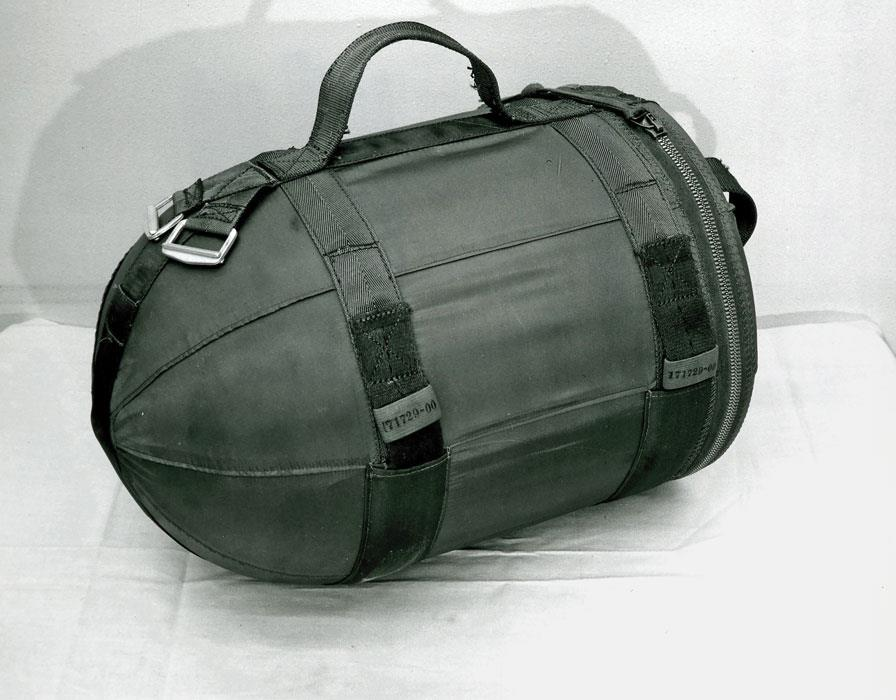
The SADM (B54) demolition charge version of the W54 in its carry bag

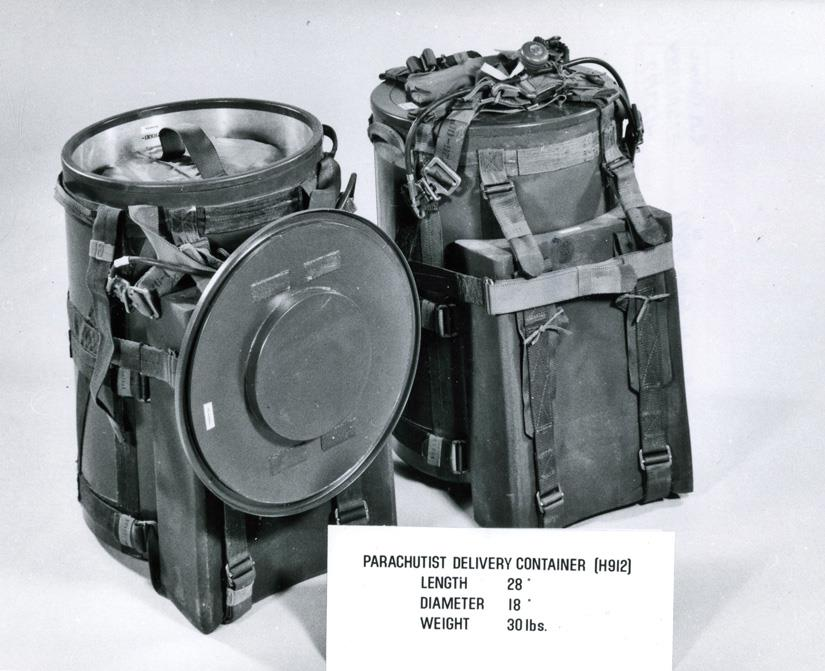
SADM hard carrying case

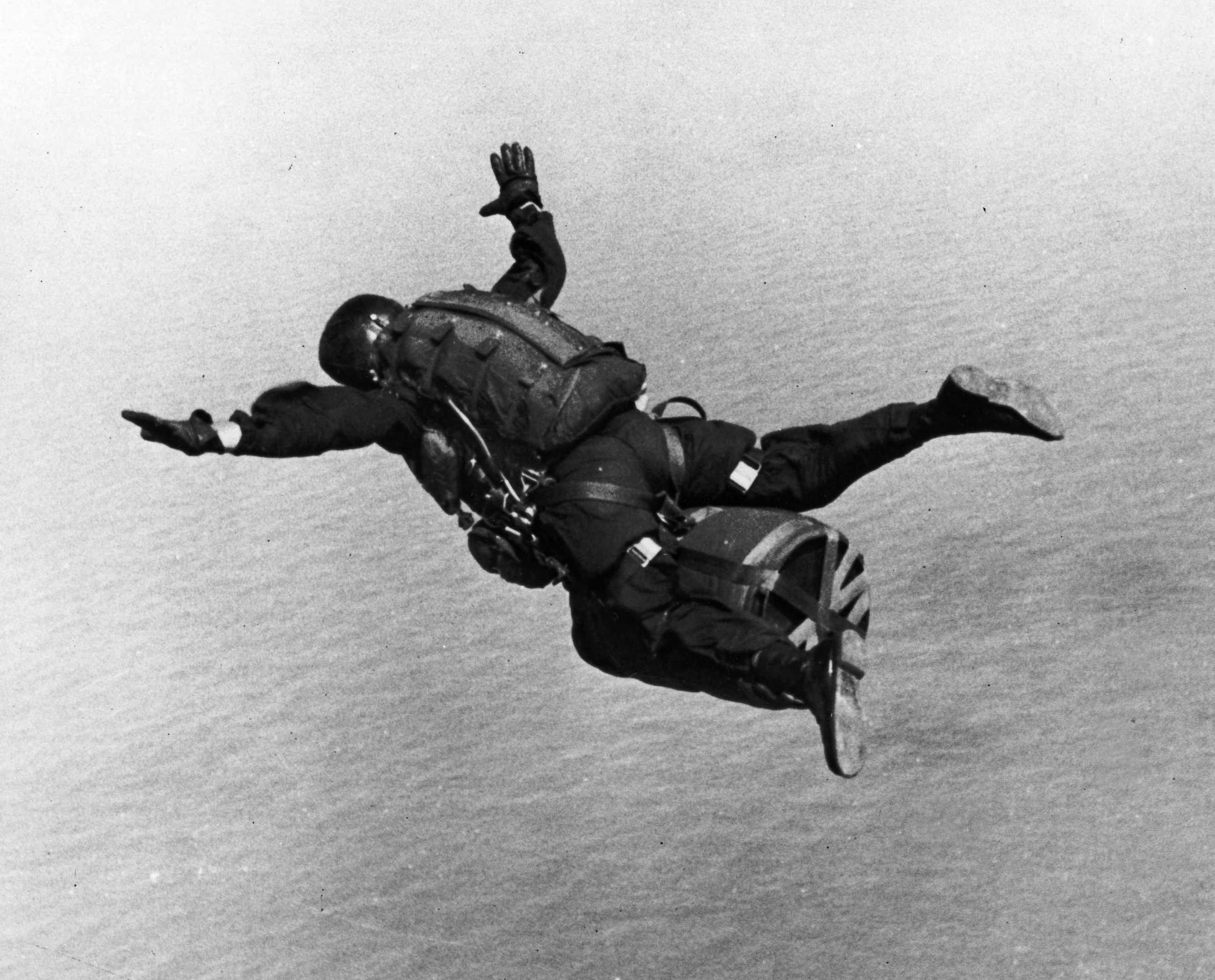
A U.S. Army Special Forces paratrooper with the Green Light Teams conducts a high-altitude low-opening military freefall jump with a MK54.

The W54 (also known as the Mark 54 or B54) was a tactical nuclear warhead developed by the United States in the late 1950s. The weapon is the smallest nuclear weapon in both weight and yield to have entered US service. It was a compact implosion device based on plutonium-239, and in various versions and mods it had a yield of 10 to 1,000 tons of TNT (42 to 4,184 gigajoules).

The weapon had two distinct versions: a warhead used in the AIM-26 Falcon air-to-air missile and in the Davy Crockett recoilless gun, and another used in the Special Atomic Demolition Munition (SADM) system, along with several mods for each version. The two types are distinct in that much of the design between them was different, to the point that during the development of the SADM it was proposed that it be given its own unique mark designation.

A later development was the W72, which was a rebuilt W54 used with the AGM-62 Walleye guided bomb. The W72 was in service until 1979.

== Development ==
=== Warhead ===
Interest in a lightweight, low-yield weapon for the Falcon and Davy Crockett began in 1958. The weapon was initially developed by the University of California Radiation Laboratory at Livermore under the XW-51 designation, but in January 1959 the development of the weapon was transferred to Los Alamos National Laboratory and redesignated the XW-54.

For both the Falcon and Davy Crockett, the Department of Defense would supply the weapon systems and adaptation kits for the warheads, while the warheads and firing systems would be the responsibility of the Atomic Energy Commission. First production date for the Falcon warhead was planned for February 1961 while the warhead for the Davy Crockett was given a planned first production date of October 1961. This was because it was felt that the higher acceleration experienced by the warhead in Davy Crockett service would make certification of parts more challenging.

It was hoped during development that the same warhead for both applications could be used, but the requirements for the environmental sensing device - used to detect if the weapon was in its correct military environment and in turn disable weapon safing devices - for each application was quite different. In Falcon use, the warhead experienced 17 g (170 m/s^{2}) of acceleration for 0.8 seconds while in Davy Crockett use the weapon experienced 1,800 to 2,500 g (18,000 to 25,000 m/s^{2}) for 3 milliseconds. The envisioned device was one that would not actuate under less than 10 g (98 m/s^{2}) or under less than 2 g per second (20 m/s^{2}/s).

Sandia reported the problem in May 1959, stating that if Falcon warheads had the greater priority, an interim environmental sensing device could be developed. The Air Force subsequently accelerated the availability date for the Falcon missile and Sandia design released the warhead without an environmental sensing device in October 1959. However, revisions were issued in December before warhead production began with a suitable environmental sensing device for Falcon use.

A single environmental sensing device for both systems was abandoned at this time and development on the XW-54-X1 and XW-54-X2 for Davy Crockett use began. The XW-54-X2 warhead would lack any environmental sensing device for initial deployment, while the XW-54-X1 fitted with a suitable environmental sensing device would replace the XW-54-X2 as the weapon became available. Sandia were against the development of the XW-54-X2 as simply disconnecting the adaptation kit would disable the weapon's safeties.

The Department of Defense cancelled the requirement for the XW-54-X2 (now called the Mk 54 Mod 1) in July 1960 after parts manufacturing slippage delayed production of the warhead. This also caused the accelerated schedule for the Falcon application to slip to January 1961.

Production of both the Falcon warhead (now called the Mk 54 Mod 0) and the XW-54-X1 for the Davy Crockett (now called the Mk 54 Mod 2) was achieved in April 1961. Both the Mod 0 and Mod 2 weapons were interchangeable by changing the environmental sensing device. The final weapon was 10.862 inches (275.9 mm) in diameter, 15.716 inches (399.2 mm) in length and 50.9 pounds (23.1 kg) in weight, and was packaged in a fiberglass housing coated in a conductive lacquer to provide an electrical shield.

=== Special Atomic Demolition Munition ===
Interest in the Special Atomic Demolition Munition (SADM) began in February 1958 when the Army desired a new munition that could be carried by one man. The project was delayed by the needs of the Falcon and Davy Crockett application until November 1959.

The proposal noted that the existing atomic demolition munition (ADM), the T-4 Atomic Demolition Munition, was based on the Mark 9 gun-type artillery shell and that transport required four men, each carrying a 40-pound (18 kg) section of the weapon. It was felt that the XW-54 SADM proposal could produce a weapon of 11.875 inches (301.6 mm) diameter, 17.5 inches (440 mm) long and a weight of 56 pounds (25 kg) including carrying case. The weapon would also have a waterproof housing, have a pack for carrying in the field and a shock-mitigating container for parachute delivery.

Development began June 1960. Because much of the weapon would be different from the XW-54 warhead, it was proposed that the warhead be given its own unique mark designation, such as TX-58 (later used for the Polaris A-3 warhead), but the decision was made to retain the existing mark number.

The weapon was delayed until August 1963 due to issues with the timer. These included premature firing of the timer and issues with bearing materials. An interim Mk 54 Mod 0 weapon (now called the B54-0) was put into production in April 1963. Drop tests for this weapon were conducted at velocities up to 31 feet per second (9.4 m/s) vertical and 17 feet per second (5.2 m/s) horizontal without damage.

Production of the B54 Mod 1 SADM began in August 1964. The weapon was 12 inches (305 mm) diameter, 18 inches (457 mm) long and weighed 58.5 pounds (26.5 kg), and included the warhead, fuzing and firing system with a mechanical timer, ferroelectric firing set and a sealed housing. The body was constructed with aluminium forgings and moulded fibreglass, and foam-rubber insulation was used between the warhead and case. Dials were illuminated with a tritium-phosphor paint for easy night-reading. A housing for underwater emplacement was provided which included external controls.

The B54 Mod 2 started production in June 1965. The weapon was the same size as previous mods, but now weighed 70 pounds (32 kg). This may be the highest yield boosted version of the weapon.

== Design ==
The weapon was based on the Scarab device, which descended from the Gnat device. Scarab was also used as a primary stage in the thermonuclear weapon test Dominic Nambe.

=== Warhead ===
Configured in the Davy Crockett role, the weapon contained two sets of fuzes: a radar based fuze set for a 40 feet (12 m) airburst and a capacitance based fuze set for 2 feet (0.61 m) airburst. These fuzes represented the high and low airburst modes of the weapon. The device contained 26 pounds (12 kg) of high explosives.

Some sources give the yield for the Mod 0 as 250 tons of TNT (1,000 GJ) and the Mod 2 as 10 to 20 tons of TNT (42 to 84 GJ), but declassified warhead development documents indicate the only difference between these two warheads was the environmental sensing devices used and that the warheads were field convertible, suggesting the weapons had the same yield. Official documents give the yield as 20 tonnes of TNT (84 GJ) when configured in the XM388 round for the Davy Crockett.

It has been alleged that the British "Wee Gwen" warhead was a copy of the W54. Though never put into production, Wee Gwen was to contain 1.6 kilograms (3.5 lb) of plutonium and 2.42 kilograms (5.3 lb) uranium.

=== Special Atomic Demolition Munition ===
Yield is estimated to be 10 to 1,000 tons of TNT (42 to 4,184 GJ). According to former Green Light team members, the B54 SADM came with two selectable yield options of 0.1 or 0.2 kilotons.

The B54 SADM included a Field Wire Remote Control System (FWRCS), a device that enabled the sending of safe/arm and firing signals to the weapon via a wire for safe remote detonation of the weapon by troops. This system was tested for its resistance to electromagnetic radiation in February 1964.

== Variants ==
W54 mod numbers overlap between the warhead and SADM weapon. Weapons of the same mod number but in different applications are not the same weapons.

=== Warhead ===
Three mods of the warhead configuration were developed:

W54 Mod 0 – Warhead for AIM-4 Falcon air-to-air missile

W54 Mod 1 – Interim warhead for Davy Crockett. Lacked environmental sensing device. Never entered production.

W54 Mod 2 – Production Davy Crockett warhead with environmental sensing device. Was known as the M-388 when configured into a Davy Crockett round.

=== Special Atomic Demolition Munition ===
Three mods of the SADM configuration were developed:

B54 Mod 0 – Interim weapon with timer issues.

B54 Mod 1 – Production weapon. Came with special housing for underwater use.

B54 Mod 2 – Weapon weight increased from 58.5 pounds (26.5 kg) to 70 pounds (32 kg). May be a boosted weapon.

In service, the weapons were known as the XM129 and XM159 Atomic Demolition Charges. Which versions are associated with the XM129 name and which is associated with the XM159 name is not clear.

=== W72 warhead ===
After the AIM-26 Falcon was retired, 300 units were rebuilt into an improved configuration with a higher yield and redesignated the W72. These warheads were then used to produce a number of nuclear versions of the AGM-62 Walleye television-guided glide bomb system. The W72 variant had a yield of around 600 tons of TNT. The 300 W72 units were produced between 1970 and 1972 and were in service until 1979.

== Testing ==
Stockpiled W54 warheads were test-fired at the Nevada Test Site on 7 and 17 July 1962. In Little Feller II (7 July), the warhead was suspended 3 feet (0.91 m) above the ground. In Little Feller I (17 July), the warhead was launched as a Davy Crockett device from a stationary 155-millimeter launcher and set to detonate low airburst 1.7 miles (2.7 km) from the launch point. This test was the last atmospheric test at Nevada Test Site and was performed in conjunction with Operation Ivy Flats, a simulated military environment. It was observed by Attorney General Robert F. Kennedy and presidential adviser General Maxwell D. Taylor.

== See also ==
- List of nuclear weapons
