= Project Gnome (nuclear test) =

1961 nuclear test explosion in New Mexico, United States

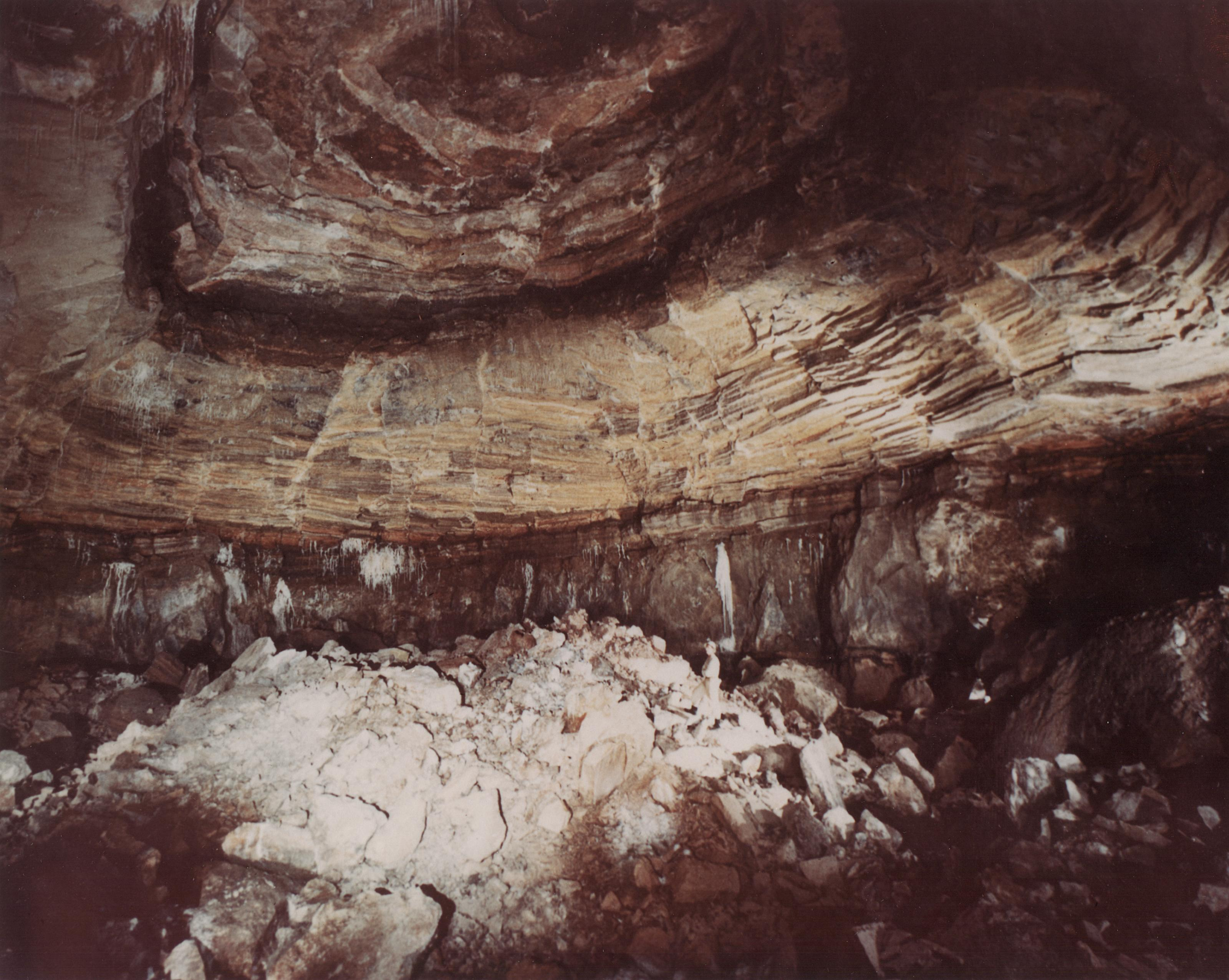
- View toward the top of the salt dome cavity created by the Gnome underground nuclear test

Information
- Country: United States
- Test series: Operation Nougat; Project Plowshare
- Test site: Gnome Site, Eddy County, New Mexico, United States
- Coordinates: 32°15′45″N 103°51′55.1″W
- Date: December 10, 1961
- Test type: Underground
- Yield: 3.1 kt

Project Gnome was the first nuclear test of Project Plowshare and was the first continental nuclear weapon test since Trinity to be conducted outside of the Nevada Test Site, and the second test in the state of New Mexico after Trinity. It was tested in southeastern New Mexico on December 10, 1961, approximately 40 km (25 mi) southeast of Carlsbad, New Mexico.

== Background ==
First announced in 1958, Gnome was delayed by the testing moratorium between the United States and the Soviet Union that lasted from November 1958 until September 1961, when the Soviet Union resumed nuclear testing, thus ending the moratorium. The site selected for Gnome is located roughly 40 km (25 mi) southeast of Carlsbad, New Mexico, in an area of salt and potash mines, along with oil and gas wells.

Unlike most nuclear tests, which were focused on weapon development, Shot Gnome was designed to focus on scientific experiments:

- "Study the possibility of using the heat produced by a nuclear explosion to produce steam for the production of electric power."
- "Explore the feasibility of recovering radioisotopes for scientific and industrial applications."
- "Use the high flux of neutrons produced by the detonation for a variety of measurements that would contribute to the scientific knowledge in general and to the reactor development program in particular."

It was discovered during the 1957 Plumbbob-Rainier tests that an underground nuclear detonation creates large quantities of heat as well as radioisotopes, but that most would quickly become trapped in the molten rock and become unusable as the rock resolidified. For this reason, it was decided that Gnome would be detonated in bedded rock salt. The plan was to then pipe water through the molten salt and use the generated steam to produce electricity. The hardened salt could be subsequently dissolved in water to extract the radioisotopes. Gnome was considered extremely important to the future of nuclear science, because it could show that nuclear weapons might be used in peaceful applications. The Atomic Energy Commission invited representatives from various nations, the U.N., the media, interested scientists and some Carlsbad residents.

While Gnome is considered the first test of Project Plowshare, it was also part of the Vela program, which was established to improve the ability of the United States to detect underground and high-altitude nuclear detonations. Vela Uniform was the phase of the program concerned with underground testing. Everything from seismic signals, radiation, ground wave patterns, electromagnetic pulse, and acoustic measurements were studied at Gnome under Vela Uniform.

== Gnome shot and aftereffects ==
Geological section at the Gnome site.

Gnome was placed 361 m (1,184 ft) underground at the end of a 340 m (1,115 ft) tunnel that was supposed to be self-sealing upon detonation. Gnome was detonated on 10 December 1961, with a yield of 3.1 kilotons. Even though the Gnome shot was supposed to seal itself, the plan did not quite work. Two to three minutes after detonation, smoke and steam began to rise from the shaft. Consequently, some radiation was released and detected off-site, but it quickly decayed. The cavity volume was calculated to be 28,000 ± 2,800 cubic metres (989,000 ± 99,000 cu ft) with an average radius of 17.4 m (57 ft) in the lower portion measured.

The Gnome detonation created a cavity about 170 ft (52 m) wide and almost 90 ft (27 m) high with a floor of melted rock and salt. A new shaft was drilled near the original and, on 17 May 1962, crews entered the Gnome Cavity. Even though almost six months had passed since the detonation, the temperature inside the cavity was still around 140 °F (60 °C). Inside, they found stalactites made of melted salt, as well as the walls of the cavity covered in salt. The intense radiation of the detonation colored the salt multiple shades of blue, green, and violet. Nonetheless, the explorers encountered only five milliroentgen, and it was considered safe for them to enter the cavern and cross its central rubble pile. While the three-kiloton explosion had melted 2400 tons of salt, the explosion had caused the collapse of the sides and top of the chamber, adding 28,000 tons of rubble that mixed with the molten salt and rapidly reduced its temperature. This was the reason the drilling program had originally been unsuccessful, finding temperatures of only 200 °F (93 °C), without high pressure steam, though the boreholes had encountered occasional pockets of molten salt at up to 1,450 °F (790 °C) deeper amid the rubble.

== Historical site ==
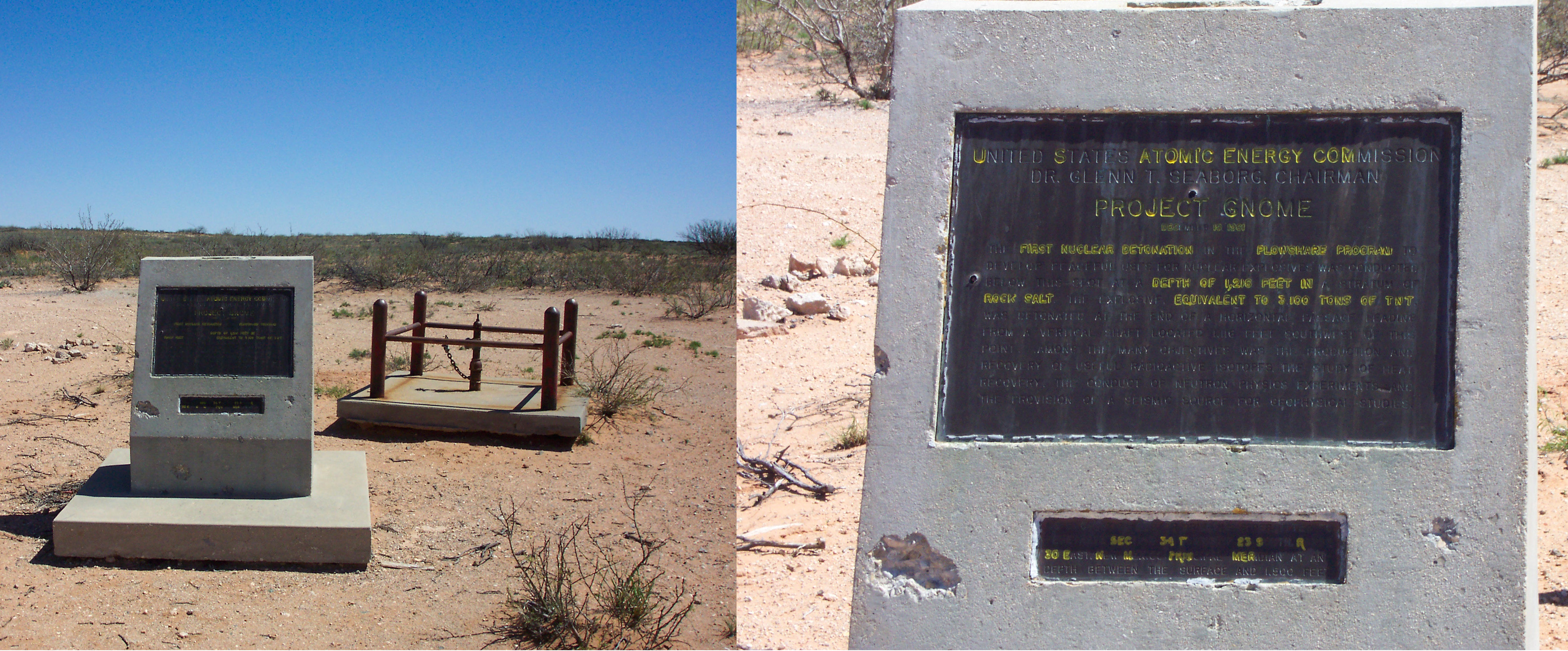
Monument at the Project Gnome site in March 2004.

The Gnome-Coach Site is open to the public and managed by the U.S. Department of Energy Office of Legacy Management. Today, all that exists on the surface to show what occurred below is a small concrete monument with two weathered plaques.

The historical plaque at ground zero reads:

United States Atomic Energy Commission
Dr. Glenn T. Seaborg, Chairman
Project Gnome
December 10, 1961
The first nuclear detonation in the Plowshare Program to develop peaceful uses for nuclear explosives was conducted below this spot at a depth of 1,216 feet in a stratum of rock salt. The explosive, equivalent to 3,100 tons of TNT, was detonated at the end of a horizontal passage leading from a vertical shaft located 1,116 feet southwest of this point. Among the many objectives was the production and recovery of useful radioactive isotopes, the study of heat recovery, the conduct of neutron physics experiments, and the provision of a seismic source for geophysical studies.

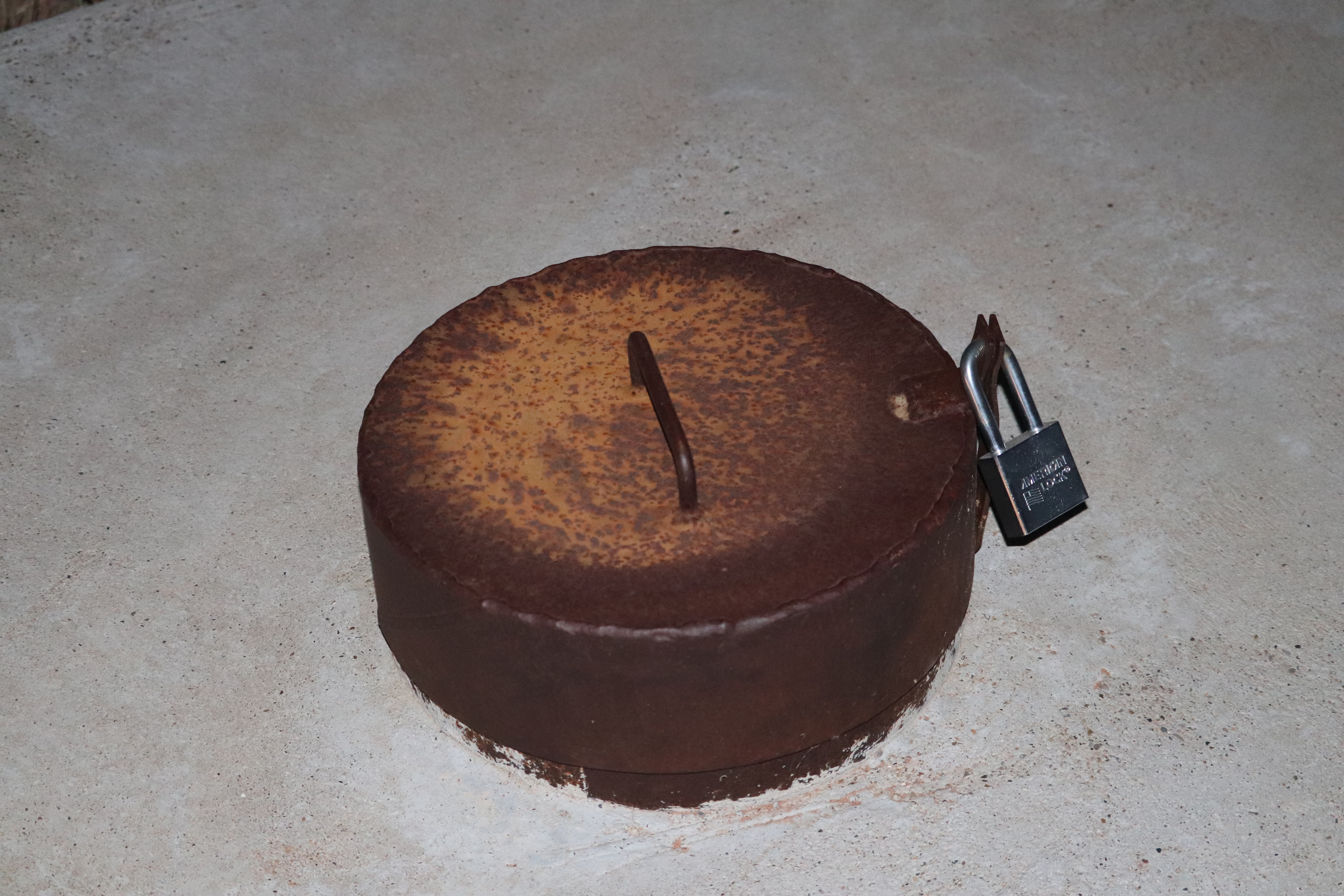
shaft to ground zero

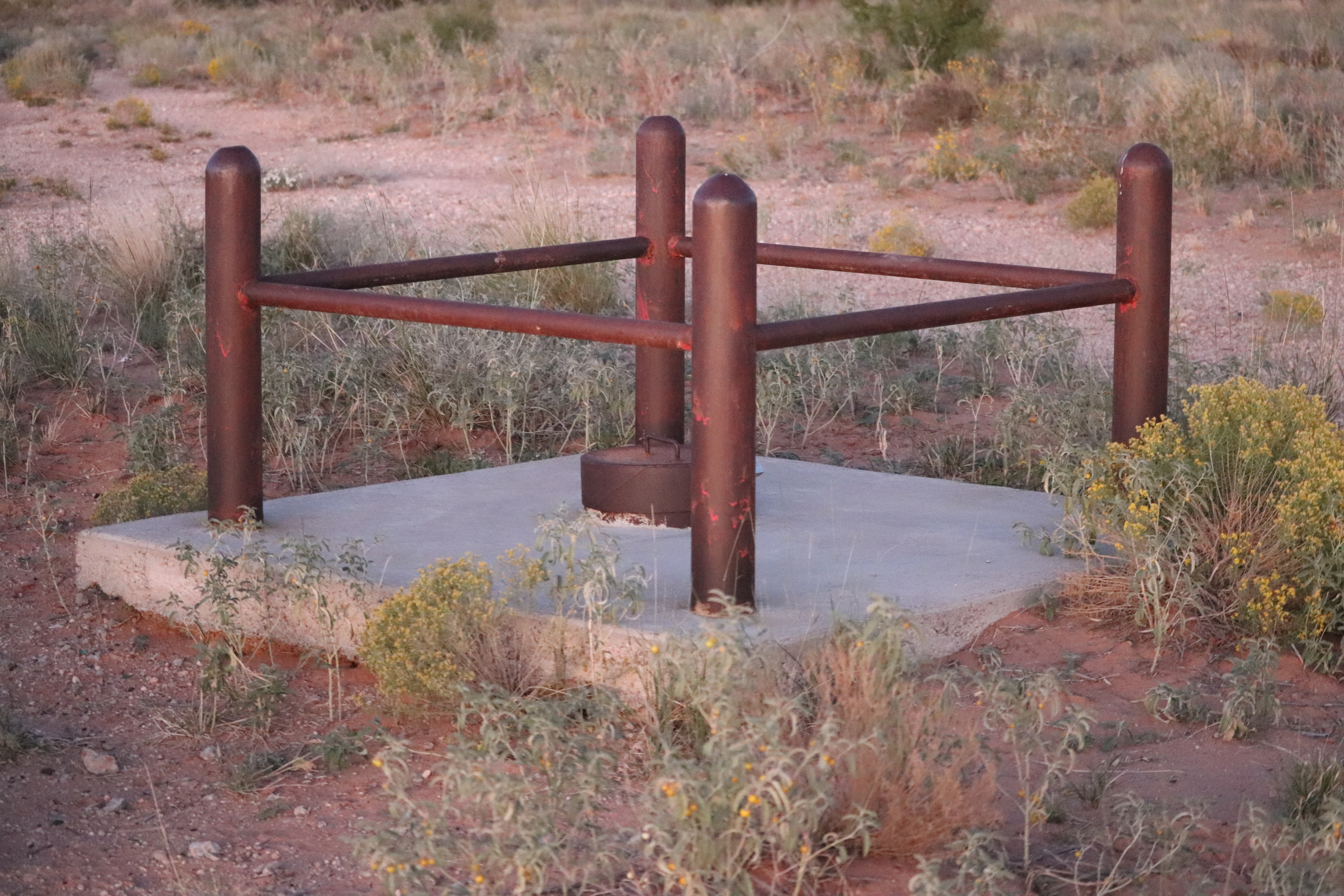
surface ground zero

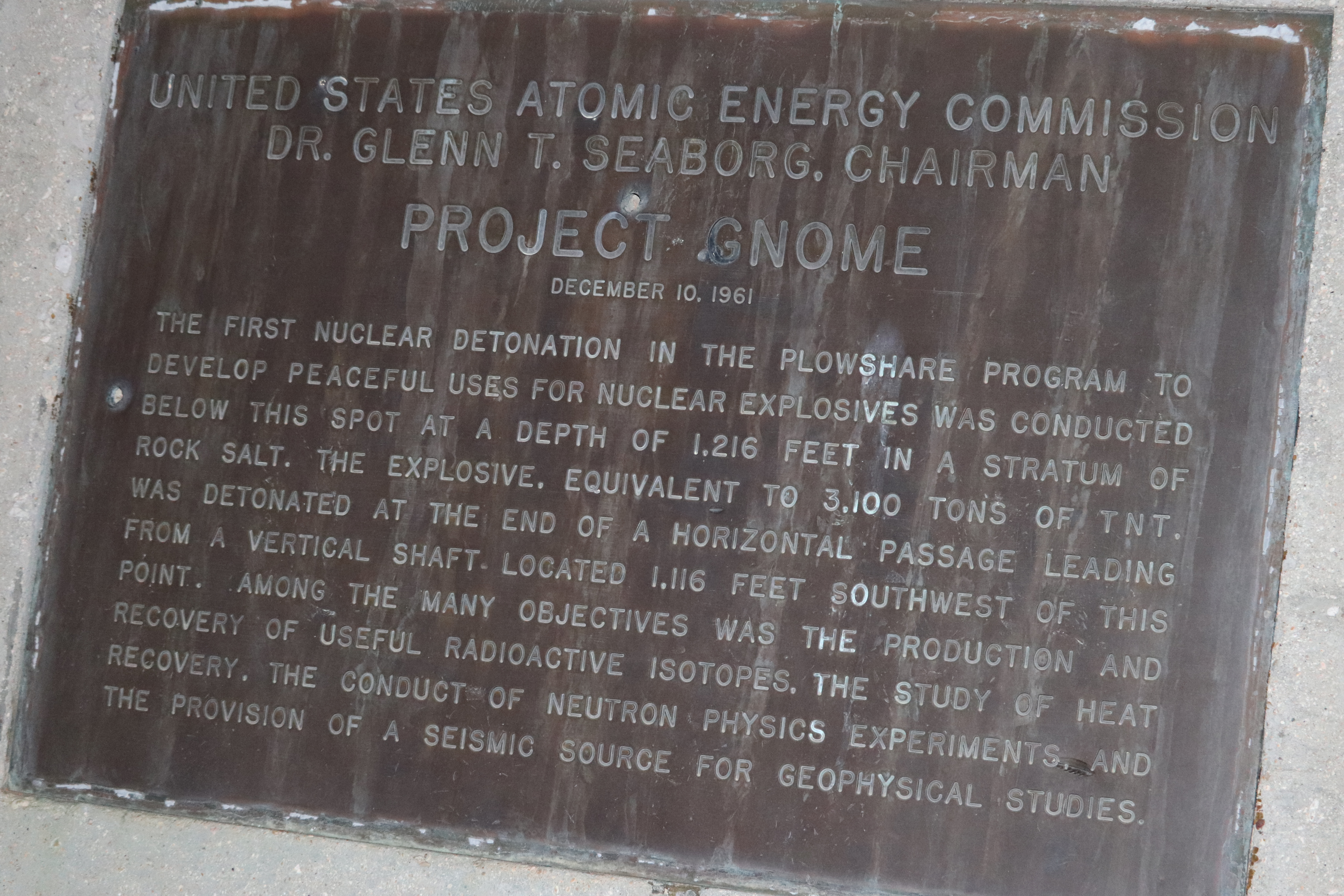
plaque at ground zero

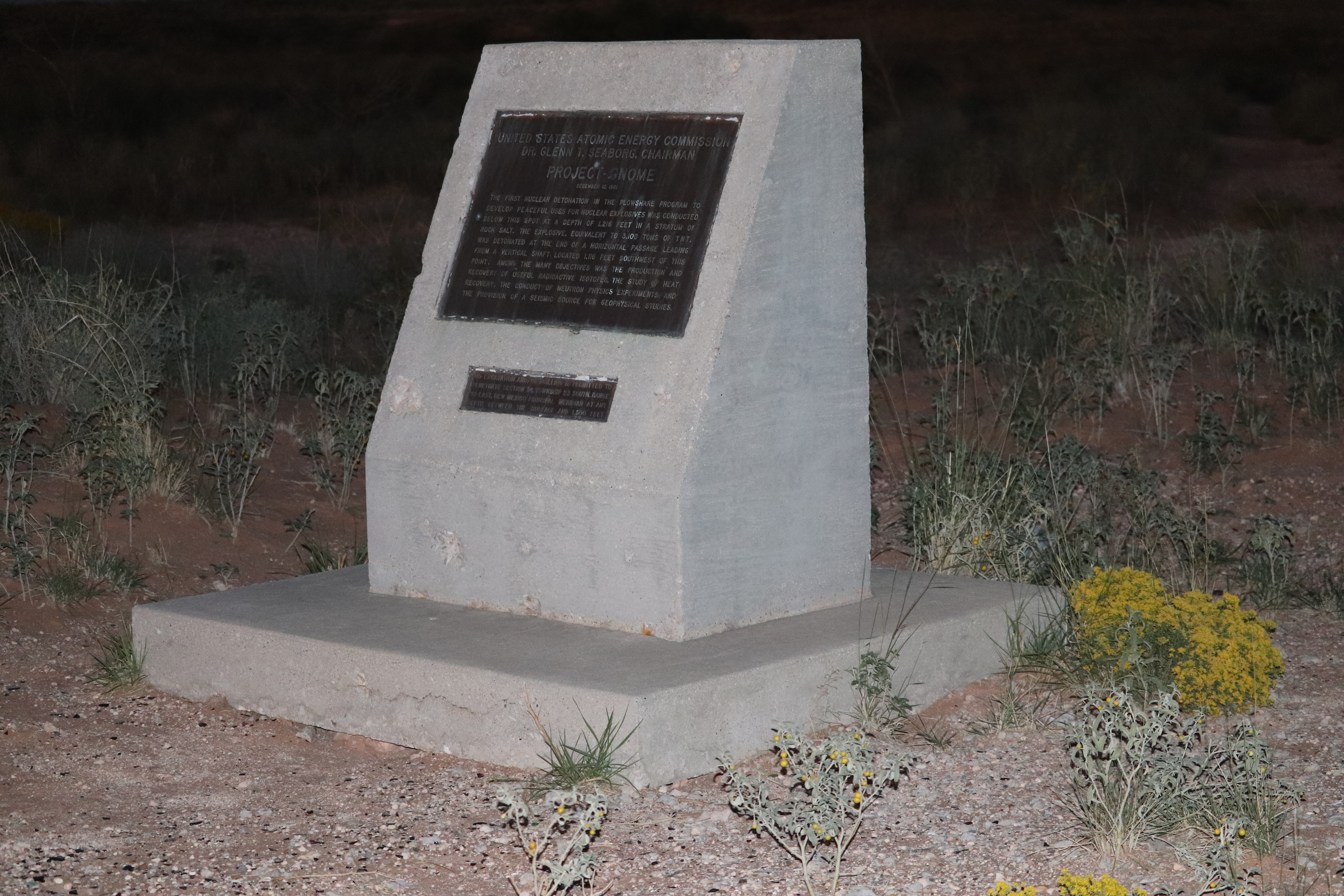
monument

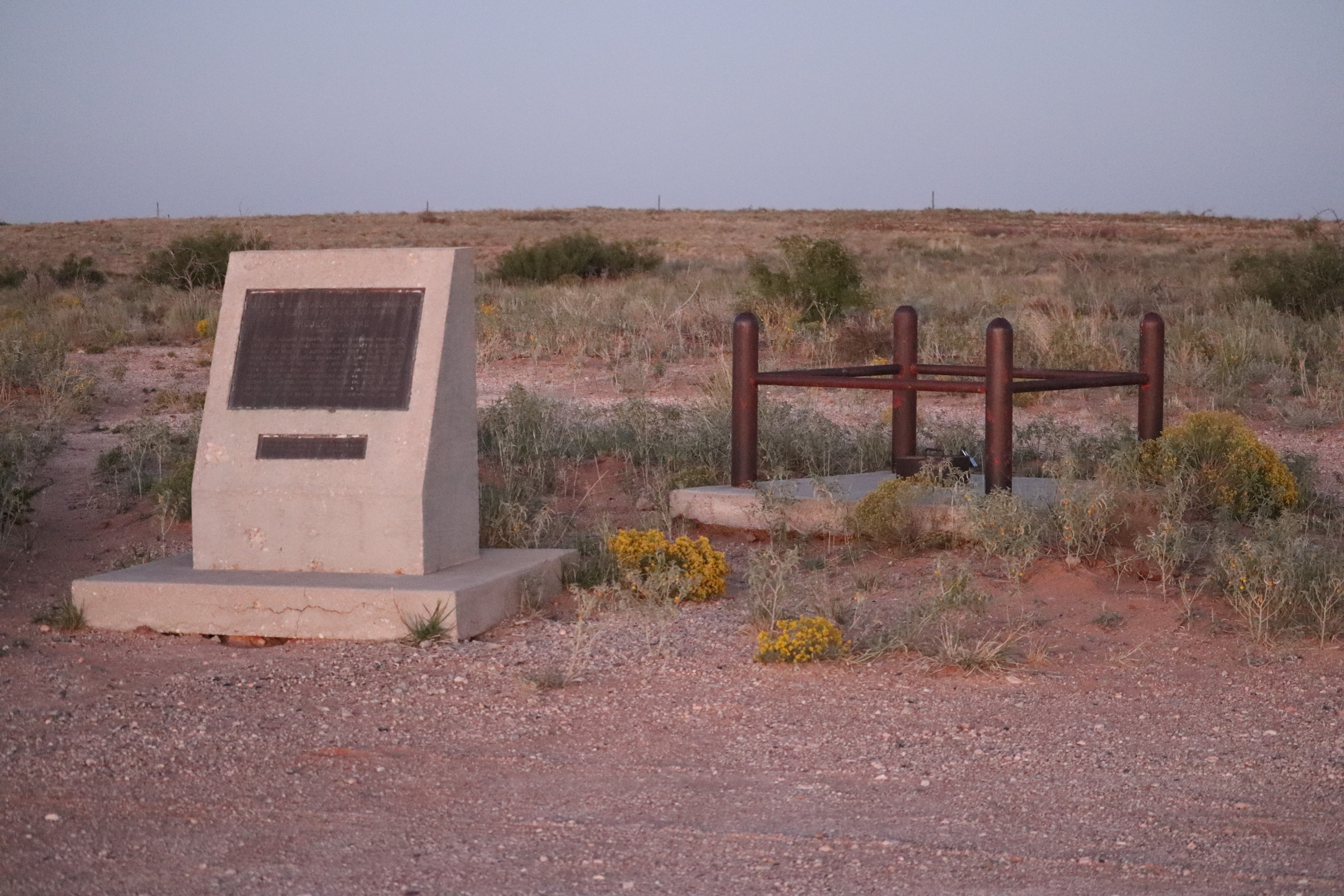
site

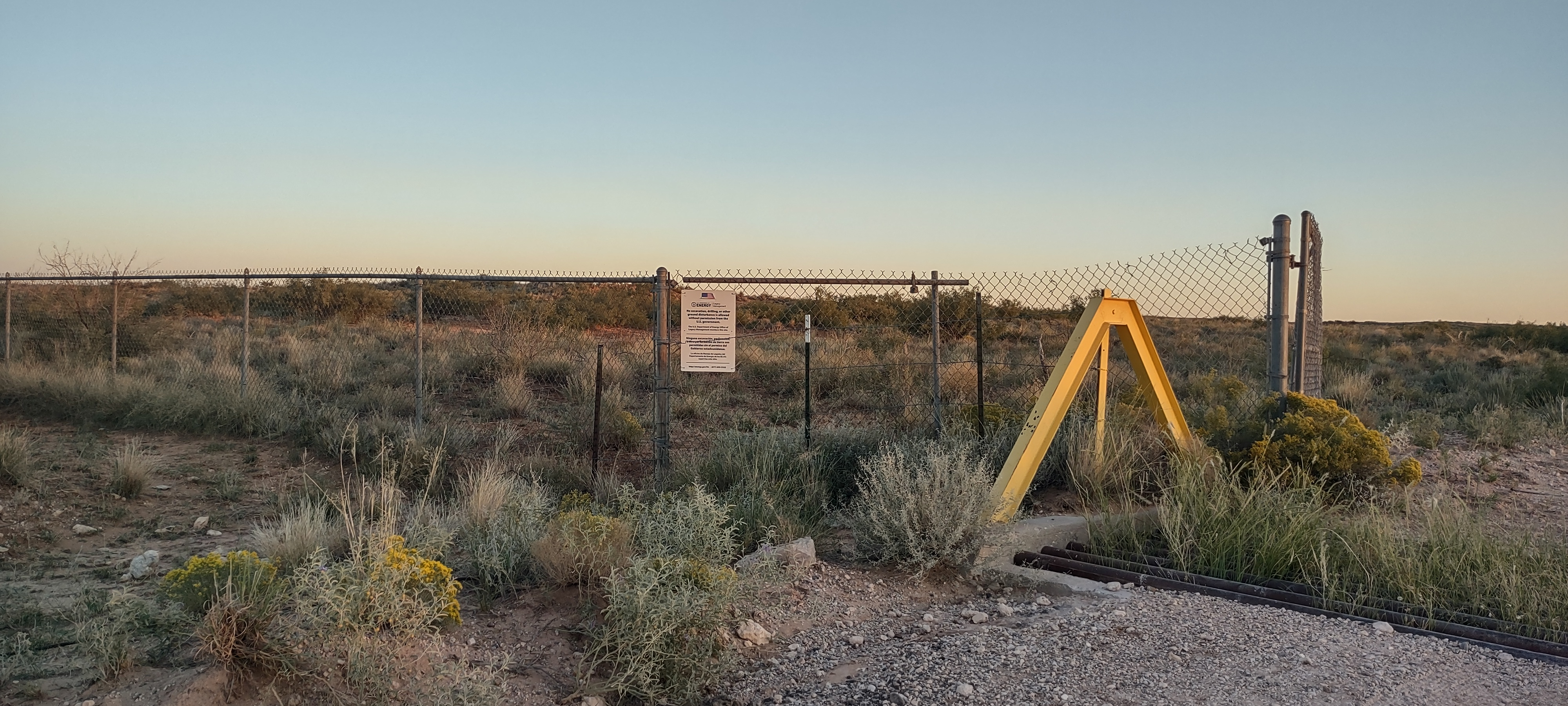
site entrance

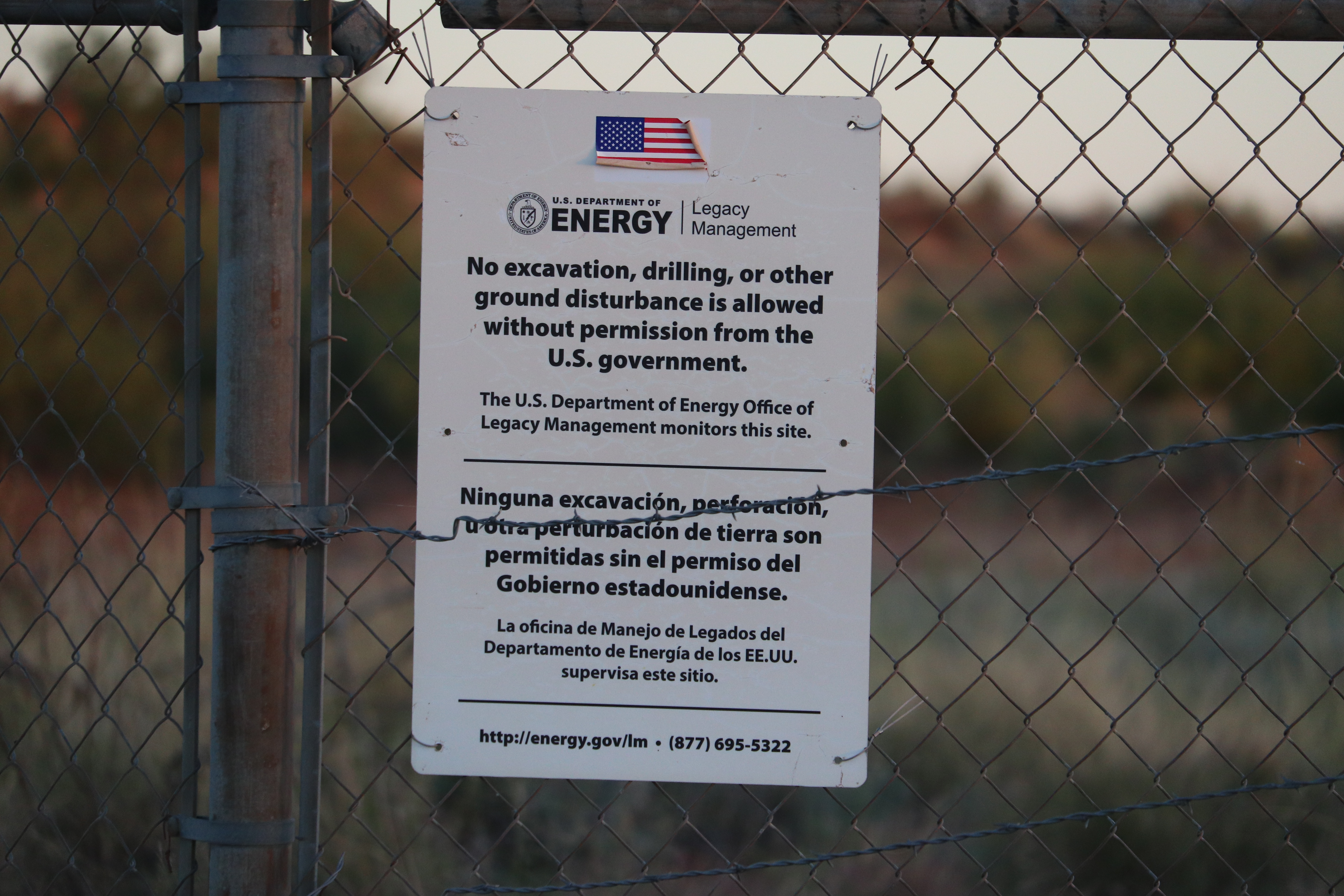
sign at entrance

== See also ==
- Project Gasbuggy
- Waste Isolation Pilot Plant
