= W47 =

American thermonuclear warhead design

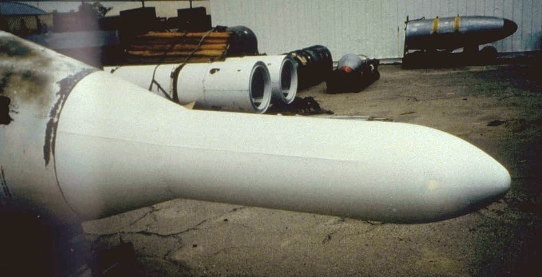
The W47 warhead reentry vehicle

The W47 was an American thermonuclear warhead used on the Polaris A-1 submarine-launched ballistic missile system. Various models were in service from 1960 through the end of 1974. The warhead was developed by the Lawrence Radiation Laboratory between 1957 and 1960.

The W47 was 18 in (460 mm) in diameter and 47 in (1,200 mm) long, and weighed 720 lb (330 kg) in the Y1 model and 733 lb (332 kg) in the Y2 model. The Y1 model had design yield of 600 kilotons and the Y2 model had a doubled design yield of 1.2 megatons. The W47 was the first warhead with a new, miniaturized pit. A cone-shaped extension at the base of the reentry vehicle provided stability of orientation during descent. Two small rocket motors were used to spin the warhead for better stability and symmetry during reentry.

== Design ==
Declassified British documents indicate that the W47 contained 2.5 kilograms (5.5 lb) of plutonium, 60 kilograms (130 lb) of uranium, 36 kilograms (79 lb) of lithium deuteride and 4 grams (0.14 oz) of tritium.

== Live fire testing ==
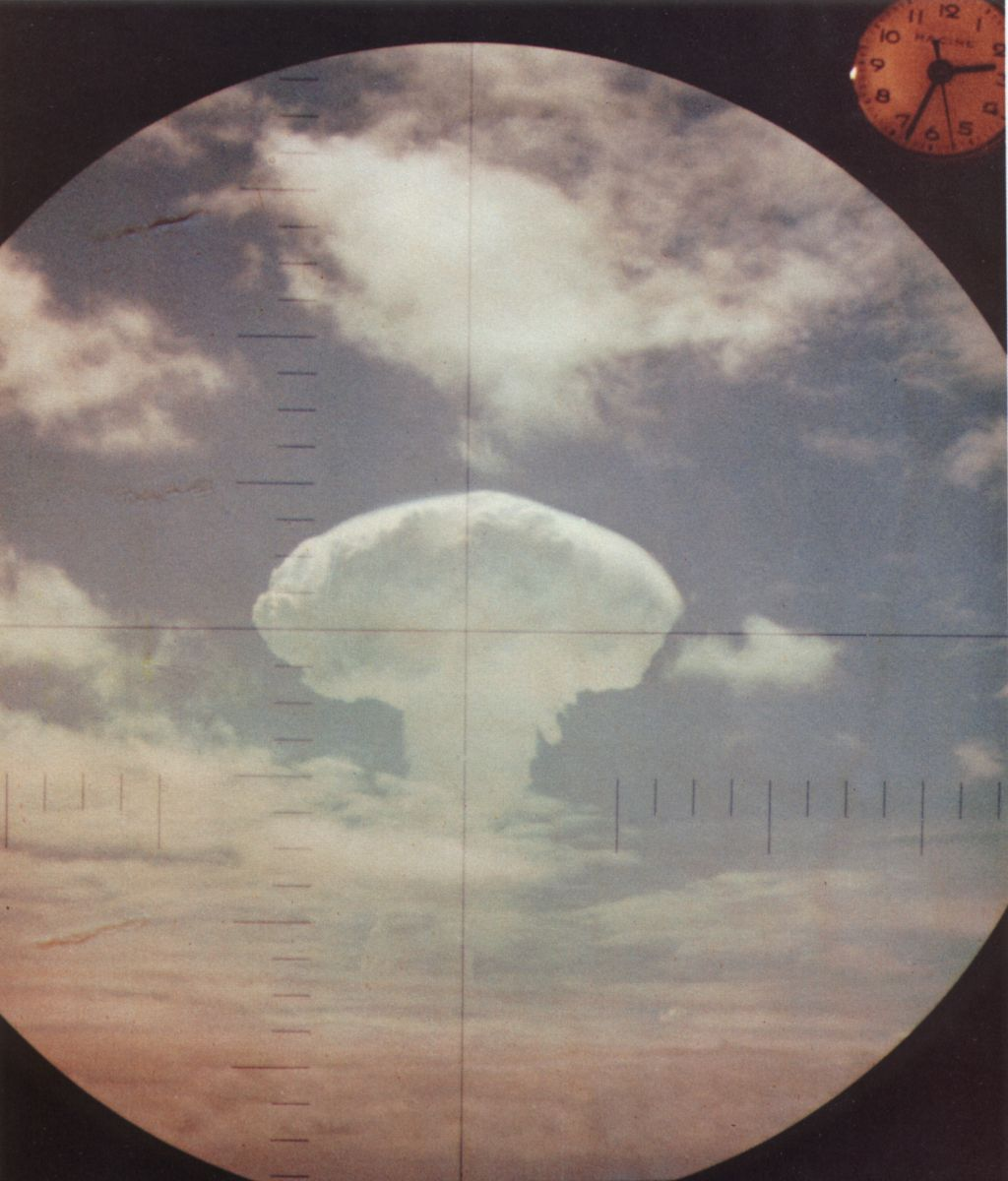
Shot Frigate Bird, as viewed from the submarine USS Carbonero.

The W47 is the only US ICBM or SLBM warhead to have been live fired in an atmospheric missile and warhead test, on May 6, 1962. This event took place during shot Frigate Bird which was part of the Dominic test series. While stationed about 6,000 kilometres (3,700 mi) southwest of Los Angeles, the American submarine USS Ethan Allen fired a Polaris-A2 missile at an open ocean target point 920 kilometres (570 mi) short of the then British Kiritimati (Christmas Island), south of Hawaii. The missile traveled a distance of 1,020 nmi (1,890 km; 1,170 mi). The test was observed by two submerged US submarines stationed approximately 30 miles (48 km) from the target point, USS Carbonero and USS Medregal. The missile warhead detonated at 23:30 GMT on May 6, 1962, approximately 1.2 miles (2 km) from the designated target point, and at the target altitude of 11,000 ft (3,400 m). The detonation was successful and had the full design yield of the W47Y1 at approximately 600 kilotons. The shot was designed to improve confidence in the US ballistic missile systems, though even after the test there was considerable controversy. This was partly because it was revealed that the warhead selected for the test had undergone modifications before testing and was not necessarily representative of the stockpile.

== Reliability controversy ==
The W47 warhead had a series of serious reliability problems with the warhead design. 300 of the EC-47 production prototype model were produced from April 1960 through June 1960, and were all promptly retired in June 1960 due to reliability concerns. Production of Y1 and Y2 models then proceeded in 1960 through 1964. A total of 1060 Y1 and Y2 models were produced, but they were found to have so many reliability problems that no more than 300 were ever in service at any given time. In 1966, 75% of the stockpiled Y2 warheads were thought to be defective and unusable. Repair programs continued for some time.

A number of the Polaris warheads were replaced in the early 1960s, when corrosion of the pits was discovered during routine maintenance.

Failures of the W45, W47, and W52 warheads are still an active part of the debate about the reliability of the US nuclear weapons force moving into the future, without ongoing nuclear testing.

A one-point safety test performed on the W47 warhead just prior the 1958 moratorium (Hardtack/Neptune) failed, yielding a 100-ton explosion. Because the test ban prohibited the testing needed for inherently safe one-point safe designs, a makeshift solution was adopted: a boron-cadmium wire was folded inside the pit during manufacture, and pulled out by a small motor during the warhead arming process. This wire had a tendency to become brittle during storage, and break or get stuck during arming, which prevented complete removal and rendered the warhead a dud. It was estimated that 50-75% of warheads would fail. This required a complete rebuild of the W47 primaries. The oil used for lubricating the wire also promoted corrosion of the pit.

== See also ==
- List of nuclear weapons
