= W55 (nuclear warhead) =

US tactical nuclear warhead

W55 nuclear warhead
- Type: Nuclear weapon
- Place of origin: United States

Production history
- Designer: Lawrence Livermore National Laboratory
- Produced: January 1964 to March 1968 and May 1974 to April 1974
- No. built: 285 warheads produced in two production runs

Specifications
- Mass: 465 lb (211 kg)
- Length: 39.4 inches (100 cm)
- Diameter: 13 in (33 cm)
- Blast yield: Disputed, either 1 to 5 kilotonnes of TNT (4.2 to 20.9 TJ) or 25 kilotonnes of TNT (100 TJ)

The W55 was a tactical nuclear weapon that was in service with the US Navy from 1964 to 1990, and was carried by the UUM-44 SUBROC submarine-launched missile as a nuclear depth bomb.

The last W55 warhead was dismantled in December 1996.
