= W73 =

W73 may refer to:

- W73 (nuclear warhead)
- Dodecadodecahedron
- Shimonuma Station
