= USS Vammen =

Buckley-class destroyer escort

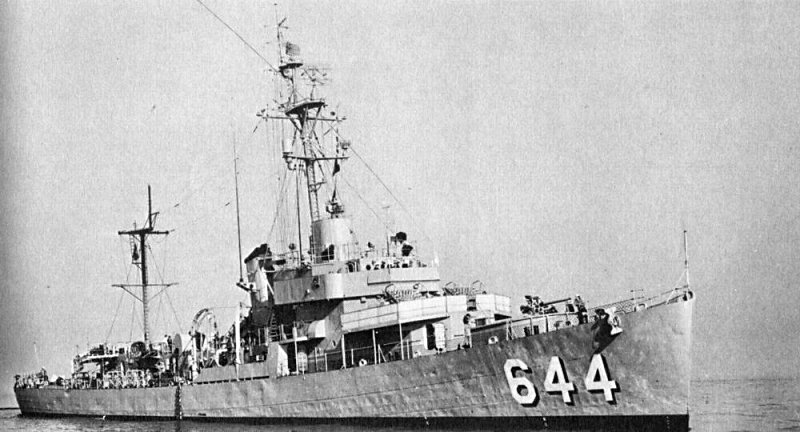
- USS Vammen (DE-644) off San Francisco's shore, taken 12 March 1957

History

United States
- Name: USS Vammen
- Namesake: Clarence E. Vammen, Jr.
- Ordered: 1942
- Builder: Bethlehem Shipbuilding Corporation, San Francisco
- Laid down: 1 August 1943
- Launched: 21 May 1944
- Commissioned: 27 July 1944
- Decommissioned: 18 June 1960
- In service: 18 June 1960
- Out of service: 2 October 1961
- Recommissioned: 2 October 1961
- Decommissioned: 1 August 1962
- In service: 1 August 1962
- Out of service: 12 July 1969
- Stricken: 12 July 1969
- Honors and awards: 1 battle star (World War II); 1 engagement star (Korea)
- Fate: Sunk as a target, 18 February 1971

General characteristics
- Class & type: Buckley-class destroyer escort
- Displacement: 1,400 long tons (1,422 t) standard; 1,673 long tons (1,700 t) full load
- Length: 306 ft (93 m)
- Beam: 37 ft (11 m)
- Draft: 13 ft 6 in (4.11 m)
- Propulsion: Turbo-electric drive, 12,000 shp (8.9 MW); 2 shafts
- Speed: 23 knots (43 km/h; 26 mph)
- Complement: 15 officers, 198 men
- Armament: 3 × 3"/50 caliber guns; 1 × quad 1.1"/75 caliber gun; 8 × single 20 mm guns; 1 × triple 21-inch (533 mm) torpedo tubes; 1 × Hedgehog anti-submarine mortar; 8 × K-gun depth charge projectors; 2 × depth charge tracks

USS Vammen (DE-644) was a Buckley-class destroyer escort of the United States Navy.

The ship was named after Charles Earl Vammen Jr., a naval aviator killed during the Battle of Midway in June 1942.

== Construction and commissioning ==
Vammen was laid down on 1 August 1943 at San Francisco, California, by the Bethlehem Steel Corporation; launched on 21 May 1944, sponsored by Mrs. Earle Morgan, aunt of the late Ensign Vammen; and commissioned on 27 July 1944.

== World War II ==
Following commissioning, Vammen fitted out through mid-August 1944 and later conducted her shakedown out of San Diego, California, into late September before undergoing a post-shakedown availability at her builder's yard. Underway for Pearl Harbor, Territory of Hawaii, on 13 October, the new destroyer escort convoyed SS Phillipa to the Hawaiian Islands before reporting for duty to Commander, Service Force, Pacific Fleet, on 21 October.

For the remainder of October and all of November, the destroyer escort trained out of Pearl Harbor, operating in company with various submarines and aircraft carriers, perfecting techniques of anti-submarine warfare and escort duty. She then escorted SS Cushman Davis via Funafuti in the Ellice Islands to Espiritu Santo, before she steamed independently to Pearl Harbor, arriving at the Pacific Fleet's main base three days after Christmas 1944.

Vammen plane-guarded for Bataan (CVL-29) early in January 1945 before escorting the merchantman SS Exira to Eniwetok in the Marshalls from 9 to 16 January. While returning to Pearl Harbor, Vammen responded to a radio request for assistance from LST-598 which had an ill crewman. The destroyer escort rendezvoused with the landing ship at sea on 20 January and took the sick man on board. The following day, off Johnston Island, Vammen transferred the man to a hospital boat, sent from that outpost, for medical treatment ashore. The destroyer escort arrived back at Pearl Harbor on 23 January.

At the end of the month, Vammen sailed for the Marshall Islands, escorting Convoy PD-278-T, consisting of the attack transports Montrose (APA-212) and Mountrail (APA-213). Departing Pearl Harbor on 30 January, PD-278-T arrived at Eniwetok on 7 February. Vammen headed for Hawaii the next day and, on the 10th, relieved Witter (DE-636) as escort for the escort carriers Kitkun Bay (CVE-71) and Salamaua (CVE-96) en route. They subsequently reached Pearl Harbor on 17 February.

The destroyer escort conducted one more convoy escort run to the Marshalls before she participated in her first major action. She shepherded PD-310-T, which consisted of the attack transports Meriwether (APA-203), Menard (APA-201), and Allendale (APA-127), from 22 February to 2 March, the day of their arrival at Eniwetok.

Three days later, she (as one of nine escorts) sortied with a 10-ship convoy bound for Ulithi and Kossol Roads. Detached on 9 March, she escorted the merchantman SS Westward Ho to Kossol Roads, and, two days later, departed the Palaus and proceeded to the Philippines in company with the landing ship Ozark (LSV-2) and Westward Ho, reaching Rizal, Leyte, on 13 March.

After patrolling the entrance to Leyte Gulf from 14 to 18 March, Vammen underwent an availability at San Pedro Bay alongside tender Markab (AD-21). With those repairs completed within a week's time, the destroyer escort sortied on 25 March, bound for Okinawa and her baptism of fire.

=== Okinawa ===
Steaming as part of the screen for Tractor Group "Easy", Vammen reached the Ryukyus on 1 April, the day of the initial landings on Okinawa. Detached from duty with Task Unit 51.14.2 (TU 51.14.2), for which the ship's commanding officer had been screen commander, Vammen was assigned to the western half of screening station A-39. Later that day, she received orders to screen LST Group "Dog" during its night retirement. While maneuvering at 15 knots through the congested transport area under poor visibility conditions, the destroyer escort struck a heavy floating object with her bow at 21:00. A few seconds later, an explosion occurred beneath her stern, as though a depth charge had exploded under the ship.

After noticing marked vibrations, Vammen reduced speed to 10 knots. Repair parties reported no evident damage, but the vibrations indicated damage to shafts or propellers. As it turned out, the ship's starboard propeller had been damaged and required replacement. Nevertheless, she completed her assigned mission proceeding to rendezvous with the LST group on its night retirement.

At 06:45 the next day, she resumed her screening station, A-39, but because of her reduced speed capacity, was ordered to take station A-50. Fortunately for Vammen, she was never attacked by enemy aircraft.

Vammen remained on station off Okinawa until 8 April. Due to the frequent enemy air raids, her crew spent an average of 10 to 12 hours a day at their general quarters stations, but as Commander King noted in his report of the ship's operations, "no undue fatigue or effect on morale or efficiency" resulted. Offered no opportunity to fire at enemy aircraft during her time off Okinawa, Vammen conducted two "hedgehog" attacks on suspected submarine contacts, neither with observable results.

With the additional problem of a burnt-out drive motor in her surface-search (SL) radar, Vammen departed Okinawa on 8 April, screening LST Group 17 to Leyte. Arriving at San Pedro Bay on 14 April, she underwent repairs alongside Markab before she was drydocked in ARD-16 to have the damaged starboard propeller replaced. Undocking on the 17th, Vammen returned to Okinawa at the end of April, screening LST Group 41.

Detached from that escort duty on 2 May, Vammen received orders to head for the scene of a submarine sighting at 15:14 on the 5th. She arrived on the scene at 17:23, and commenced a search plan in company with Halloran (DE-305), but found nothing. The ships abandoned the search at 11:00 the following day, and Vammen soon resumed her screening role off Okinawa.

The destroyer escort remained off Okinawa, screening incoming ships and off transport areas, for the rest of May. On 28 May, while anchored at the northern end of the transport area in Hagushi Bay, Vammen picked up Talk-Between-Ships (TBS) reports of incoming aircraft, "bogies", commencing beyond 50 miles (90 km). A short while later, the destroyer escort's radar picked up one enemy plane, a Kawasaki Ki-61 "Tony", first at 10 miles (20 km) and then one mile away as it circled across the ship's bow.

The "Tony" suddenly emerged from the low clouds on the escort's starboard quarter, and all of Vammen's 20-mm Oerlikons that could bear opened up, joining the other ships nearby in putting up a fierce barrage of fire. The "Tony" strafed a tug nearby but, hit in the tail and right wing, burst into flame, lost altitude, and crashed into the water without exploding, clear of any ships.

Underway on 3 June, Vammen, awarded an "assist" in the downing of the plane on 28 May, escorted an Okinawa-to-Leyte convoy between 3 and 8 June, sinking a Japanese mine with gunfire en route. After repairs alongside Markab and a docking in USS ARD-18 for repairs to her sound gear—which had been inoperative since 22 May—the destroyer escort sailed for Lingayen in company with sistership Cole (DE-641), on her way back to Okinawa.

For the remainder of June, Vammen performed the unglamorous but vital duty of screening transports and of providing local escort services to incoming convoys. She ultimately departed the Ryukyus in early July and steamed to Ulithi before returning once more to Okinawa on 15 July, commencing patrol at station D-l, off Buckner Bay, on 22 July.

Subsequently returning to Ulithi in early August, the destroyer escort returned to Okinawa on 12 August and, after fueling, got underway on 13 August as part of the screen for an Okinawa-to-Ulithi convoy. It was while underway with that convoy two days later that the ship received the welcome news of Japan's capitulation. Vammen's commanding officer recorded the event: "1745, On basis of communique No. 467, all offensive action against Japanese ceased."

Vammen reached Ulithi on 18 August and, after escorting Convoy UOK (Ulithi to Okinawa) 52 to Okinawa from 27 to 31 August, returned to Ulithi at the beginning of September. Subsequently visiting Guam and Saipan, Vammen reached Pearl Harbor on 9 November on her way back to the west coast of the United States.

The ship underwent a lengthy availability at the Puget Sound Naval Shipyard, Bremerton, Washington, that lasted into 1946. She shifted southward to San Diego and departed that port on 20 February, bound for the Hawaiian Islands, reaching Pearl Harbor on 27 February. She sailed from Oahu on 4 March, and proceeded via Guam to China.

Vammen supported the American occupation forces in their operations from the spring of 1946 into the autumn, touching at ports such as Tsingtao and Shanghai, China; and Kowloon. Departing from Shanghai on 1 July 1946, the destroyer escort reached Pearl Harbor on 16 July via Guam and Eniwetok. She then set out for the west coast of the US, reaching San Diego on 28 July.

The destroyer escort next underwent an availability at Terminal Island, California, and San Pedro in early September, and shifted to San Diego in mid-month. Vammen was subsequently decommissioned at San Diego on 3 February 1947 and placed in reserve. She was inactivated on 2 April 1947.

== Korean War ==
The Korean War meant a new lease on life for Vammen; she was reactivated and heavily modified to enable her to perform a specialized anti-submarine warfare (ASW) role. With a redesigned bridge, trainable forward-firing ASW projectors ("hedgehogs"), and improved sonar capabilities, Vammen thus became one of the most modern ASW vessels in the fleet.

Recommissioned at Mare Island Naval Shipyard, California, on 15 February 1952, Vammen operated off the west coast, out of San Diego and in the southern California area, into the summer of the following year, training. On 19 July 1953, she left San Diego behind, bound for her first deployment to the Western Pacific (WestPac) since her re-commissioning.

After proceeding via Pearl Harbor, Midway, and Yokosuka, Vammen arrived at Sasebo, Japan, on 23 August but got underway the next morning for the key port of Wonsan on the eastern coast of North Korea. She operated off Wonsan, performing patrol and gunfire support duties, from 25 August to 17 September before she returned to Sasebo.

Vammen returned to Wonsan at the end of October, and, after performing a second tour of gunfire support and patrol there, returned to the west coast of the United States. Departing Wonsan on 11 November, the destroyer escort reached San Diego on 2 December via the Shimonoseki Straits, Yokosuka, Midway and Pearl Harbor.

== 1953 – 1961 ==
Over the next six years, Vammen alternated in training operations off the coast of California, operating primarily out of San Diego, and conducting regular WestPac deployments. In 1956, while in San Diego, Vammen was used in filming a TV drama, and in 1959 the Vammen and crew were also used in filming the Jerry Lewis comedy Don't Give Up the Ship. In 1960 Vammen appeared in the episode "Beyond Limits" of the TV series Sea Hunt.

The latter provided her with excellent training opportunities. In 1955 and again in 1958, she made cruises through the Western and Central Carolines, the Bonins, the northern Marianas, and the Volcano Islands, parts of the Trust Territory of the Pacific Islands administered by the Navy. She kept a figurative "eye" on local conditions on the various atolls and islands, keeping a lookout for illegal activities in trading and shipping. Her surveillance missions varied in format. On some occasions, she sent a landing party ashore via motor whaleboat or outboard motor-powered rubber raft; and, on other occasions, Vammen remained offshore while her men scanned the island with binoculars. During the former, a pharmacist's mate (the ship's doctor) accompanied the landing party to provide medical care and advice for the sick.

On another occasion, while en route to WestPac in company with LeRay Wilson (DE-414), Vammen visited Lyttelton, New Zealand, the port of Christchurch. The two destroyer escorts remained there from 3 to 8 February 1958, while Vammen transferred 51 sacks of mail destined for Operation Deep Freeze personnel in Antarctica.

In 1959, Vammen footage appeared in the movie Don't Give Up the Ship, starring Jerry Lewis. Lewis portrayed an absentminded officer in the Navy who was accused by a member of Congress of somehow misplacing the ship.

In April 1960, Vammen was selected as a Group I Naval Reserve Training (NRT) ship; on 21 May, she was redesignated a Group II NRT ship. On 18 June 1960, the destroyer escort was de-commissioned and placed "in service".

After becoming an NRT ship, Vammen soon began to provide training for reserve surface divisions of the 11th Naval District. Those men came on board for both dockside and underway training. On the third weekend of each month and for two weeks each summer, Vammen embarked her selected reserve crew. She then conducted anti-submarine warfare (ASW), gunnery, and other shipboard training drills off the coast of California between Long Beach and San Diego. In August 1960, Vammen conducted her first annual two-week training cruise with her selected reserve crew embarked. For her performance during those evolutions, the destroyer escort received the highest grade assigned to an NRT ship of her type.

== Cold War: 1961 – 1962 ==
She subsequently conducted her second two-week cruise the following summer, 1961, ready for instant mobilization. That autumn, the Cold War tensions that escalated over the Berlin Crisis of 1961 and in the Far East (War in Vietnam (1959–1963)) resulted in the reactivation of 40 NRT ships for active duty. Accordingly, on 2 October 1961, Vammen was recommissioned at Long Beach.

Following her recommissioning, Vammen underwent her regularly scheduled overhaul at the Todd Shipyard. Transferred to Pearl Harbor as her new home on 15 December 1961, Vammen sailed for another WestPac deployment on 6 January 1962. She deployed with a hunter-killer group and arrived at Pearl on 12 January. She began refresher training soon thereafter.

Assigned to Escort Division 72 (CortDiv 72), Vammen sailed for the Philippines on 24 February. After logistics stops at Midway and Guam for fuel and minor voyage repairs, the destroyer escort reached Subic Bay on 11 March. After a brief period of upkeep, Vammen visited Manila in company with Marsh (DE-699) and Charles E. Brannon (DE-446) from 16 to 18 March. On the 19th, the three ships got underway for the Gulf of Siam.

Arriving off the southern tip of South Vietnam on 21 March, Vammen and Charles E. Brannon relieved Wiseman (DE-667) and Edmonds (DE-406) on the following day and assumed the duties of training units of the small South Vietnamese Navy in that area. From that day until 9 April, Vammen remained on station in the Gulf of Siam, off the coast of South Vietnam, maintaining American presence in that area. Heavy pressure from Communist Viet Cong forces inside South Vietnam had brought about a commitment of force there as the United States sought to bolster the American-backed regime. After visiting Subic Bay for a week of upkeep and conducting a port visit to Hong Kong, Vammen returned to her station in the Gulf of Siam. Originally, the ship's schedule had called for the ship to visit Japan and return to Pearl Harbor after visiting Hong Kong, but, as Vammen's commanding officer reported "... the efforts of Vammen and the other ex-NRT ships on the South Vietnam training mission were apparently of such value that it was decided to retain Escort Division 72 on the mission through mid-May."

There were further changes of plan afoot for Vammen, as was evidenced during the second deployment in the Gulf of Siam. On 13 May, Vammen and Charles E. Brannon were diverted from their training duties under Task Force 72 and were ordered to report for duty to commander, Task Group 76.5 (TG 76.5). Complying, the two destroyer escorts subsequently screened Valley Forge (LPH-8), Navarro (APA-215), and Point Defiance (LSD-31) while that group took a Marine Corps expeditionary force to Bangkok, Thailand. The 3rd Battalion, 9th Marines, embarked in the amphibious group were sent to Thailand in an effort to provide the friendly regime with troops to deter any Communist moves across the Mekong River. Following that operation, Vammen and her sistership escorted TG 76.5 back to Subic Bay, arriving there on 23 May.

Vammen subsequently visited Yokosuka, Japan, and participated in Exercise Powerdive, with 7th Fleet units in the Japan area, before she returned via Midway Island to her home port, Pearl Harbor, on 18 June. At Pearl from 18 June to 11 July, Vammen enjoyed the longest consecutive in-port period since February that year, undergoing much-needed repairs and maintenance. On 11 July, Vammen, in company with Colahan (DD-658), Marsh (DE-699), and Wiseman, sailed for the west coast of the United States.

After her arrival at Long Beach on 17 July, Vammen was de-commissioned on 1 August 1962, resuming her role as an NRT ship.

== Naval Reserve Training Ship (NRT) 1962-1971 ==
For the next seven years, Vammen continued her duties as an 11th Naval District NRT ship, based at Long Beach, and operating primarily in the Long Beach-Los Angeles-San Pedro area. During that time, she ranged as far north as British Columbia and as far south as Ensenada, Mexico.

On 1 August 1963, while in convoy with other NRT ships of the 11th Naval District en route to Pearl Harbor, Vammen lost steering control and collided with USS Tingey (DD-539) doing major damage to Tingey, but inflicting no personnel casualties. Tingey returned to San Diego and was subsequently removed from service, the damage being too severe to be economically repaired. Vammen's bow was repaired in Long Beach Naval Shipyard.

Age ultimately caught up with the veteran destroyer escort; and, in the summer of 1969, she was adjudged unfit for further service. Placed out of service on 12 July 1969, Vammen's NRT crew was transferred to Maddox (DD-731); and the ship herself was turned over to the Naval Inactive Ship Maintenance Facility, San Diego. Struck from the Navy List on 12 July 1969, Vammen's stripped hulk was utilized in a Condor missile test on 4 February 1971 and, as a result of the damage suffered on that date, sank on 18 February.

The wreck of the USS Vammen was found by scuba divers on 1 August 2010 in about 80 metres of water off San Clemente Island.

== Awards ==
Vammen (DE-644) earned one battle star for her World War II service and one engagement star for her Korean War service.
