= B61 Family =

Series of nuclear weapons

The B61 Family is a series of nuclear weapons based on the B61 nuclear bomb.

== B61 nuclear bomb ==
=== Initial development ===
The B61 bomb was developed by Los Alamos Scientific Laboratory (LASL; now Los Alamos National Laboratory) starting in 1960. The intent was to develop an aircraft bomb which was high yield (over 100 kilotons) and yet was small enough and had low enough drag to carry under the wing of a fighter or fighter-bomber type aircraft. One major feature was Full Fuzing Option, allowing various air and ground burst usage options; free fall air burst, parachute retarded air burst, free fall ground burst, parachute retarded ground burst, and laydown delivery.

The B61 project started in 1960 with a study contract analyzing the potential of such a weapon. The official development program was funded in 1961, and the weapon was designated TX-61 (Test/Experimental) in 1963. The first TX-61 free fall ballistic test was held at Tonopah Test Range on August 20, 1963. The first War Reserve B61-0 was accepted by the AEC on December 21, 1966.

The original models of B61 used PBX 9404, an HMX based plastic bonded explosive to implode the fissile material in the primary stage. Newer models use TATB based PBX 9502, which is an insensitive high explosive (IHE) and will resist detonation in adverse conditions such as fire, shock and impact.

=== Design ===
The overall B61 bomb is 13.3 inches (340 mm) in diameter and 141 inches (3,600 mm) long, and weighs approximately 700 pounds (320 kg) across most mods.

The nuclear device within the outer B61 envelope is probably the same overall dimensions and weight as the W80 warhead, which is 11.8 inches (300 mm) in diameter, 31.4 inches (800 mm) long and weighs about 290 pounds (130 kg).

== Warheads ==
=== W69 ===
The W69 missile warhead was produced in the early 1970s for use in the AGM-69 SRAM Short Range Attack Missile. The W69 was 15 inches (380 mm) in diameter and 30 inches (760 mm) long, weighed 275 pounds, and had a yield of 170-200 kilotons.

1,500 W69 warheads were produced.

=== W73 ===
The W73 missile warhead was designed for the AGM-53 Condor air to ground missile. Other than being described as a derivative of the B61, details of the W73 design are poorly documented.

Both the W73 and the Condor missile were cancelled and never entered service.

=== W80 ===
Two versions of the W80 cruise missile warhead were designed and deployed. Both are the same basic size and shape and weight: 11.8 inches in diameter, 31.4 inches long, and weight of 290 pounds.

==== W80-0 ====
The BGM-109 Tomahawk TLAM-N cruise missile was equipped with a W80-0 warhead. The W80-0 used supergrade plutonium with less inherent radioactivity, due to missile storage in close proximity to submarine crew. The weapon lacks the metal attachment points featured on the Mod 1 variant and instead features a plastic guard of some sort. The W80-0 has a variable yield of 5 or 150 kilotons.

367 W80-0 warheads were produced.

==== W80-1 ====
The AGM-86 ALCM and ACM cruise missiles used the W80-1 variant warhead. It has a yield of 5 or 150 kilotons.

1,750 W80-1 warheads were produced.

=== W81 ===
The W81 missile warhead was designed for use on the SM-2 missile. An enhanced radiation version was proposed, but the final version was fission-only. Detailed dimensions and weight are unknown. Yields are described as 2-4 kilotons.

The W81 was cancelled and never entered service.

=== W84 ===
The W84 is a LLNL design based on the B61, used in the Ground Launched Cruise Missile. It is slightly larger (13 inches diameter, 34 inches long) and heavier (388 pounds) than the otherwise similar W80 warheads, possibly to make it safer for ground handling in the field.

Between 300 and 350 W84 warheads were produced. They remain in US inactive inventory.

=== W85 ===
Used on the Pershing II IRBM missile, the W85 warhead was a cylinder 13 inches (330 mm) in diameter and 42 inches (1,100 mm) long. It had a variable yield from 5 to 80 kilotons.

120 W85 warheads were produced. They were recycled into B61 Mod 10 bombs after Pershing II was scrapped.

=== W86 ===
Some sources have described the W86 as being B61 derived, but other sources have described the W86 as being 170 millimetres (6.7 in) in diameter, substantially smaller than the B61.

== Gallery ==
B61 variants

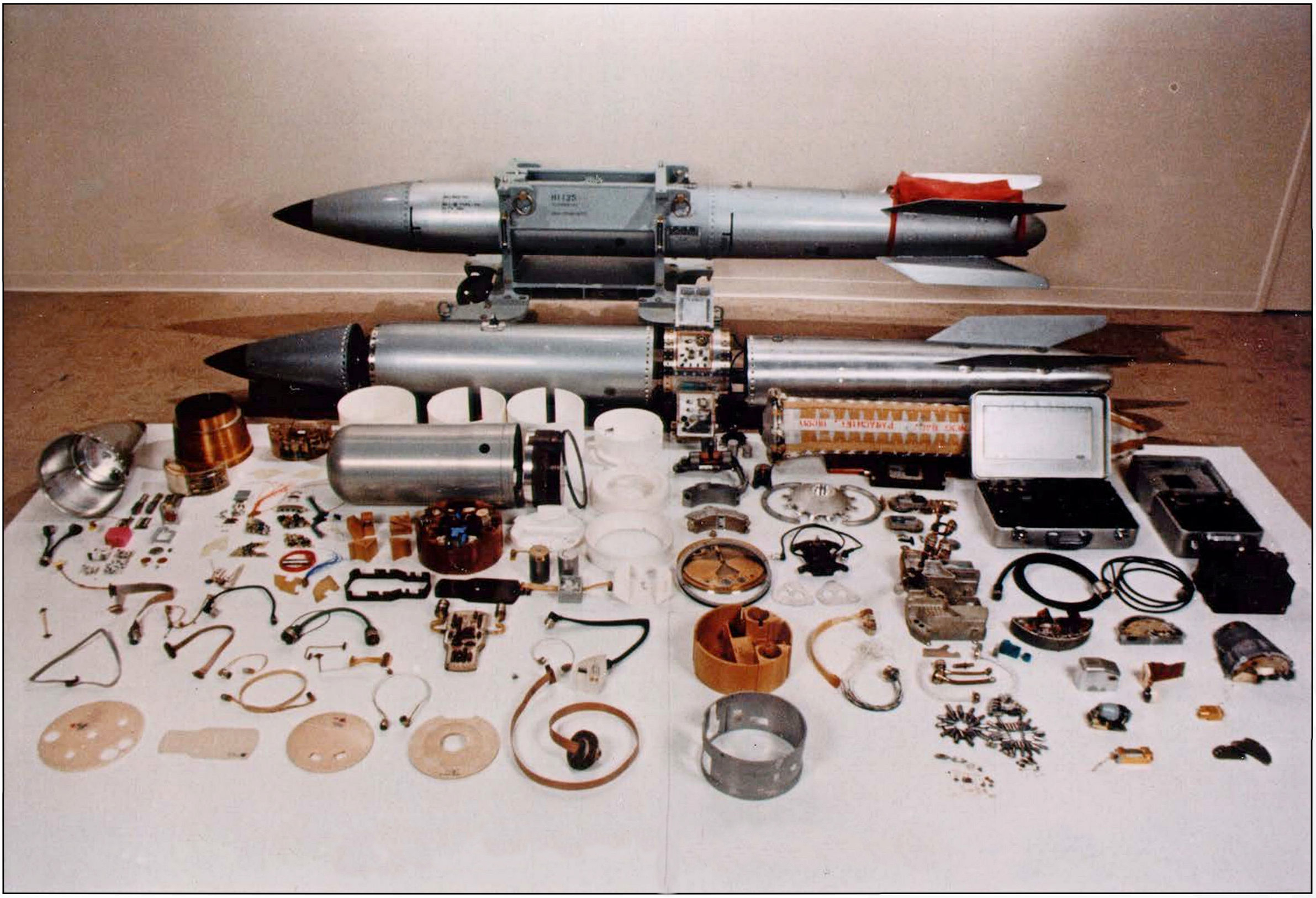
B61 nuclear bomb, assembled and disassembled.

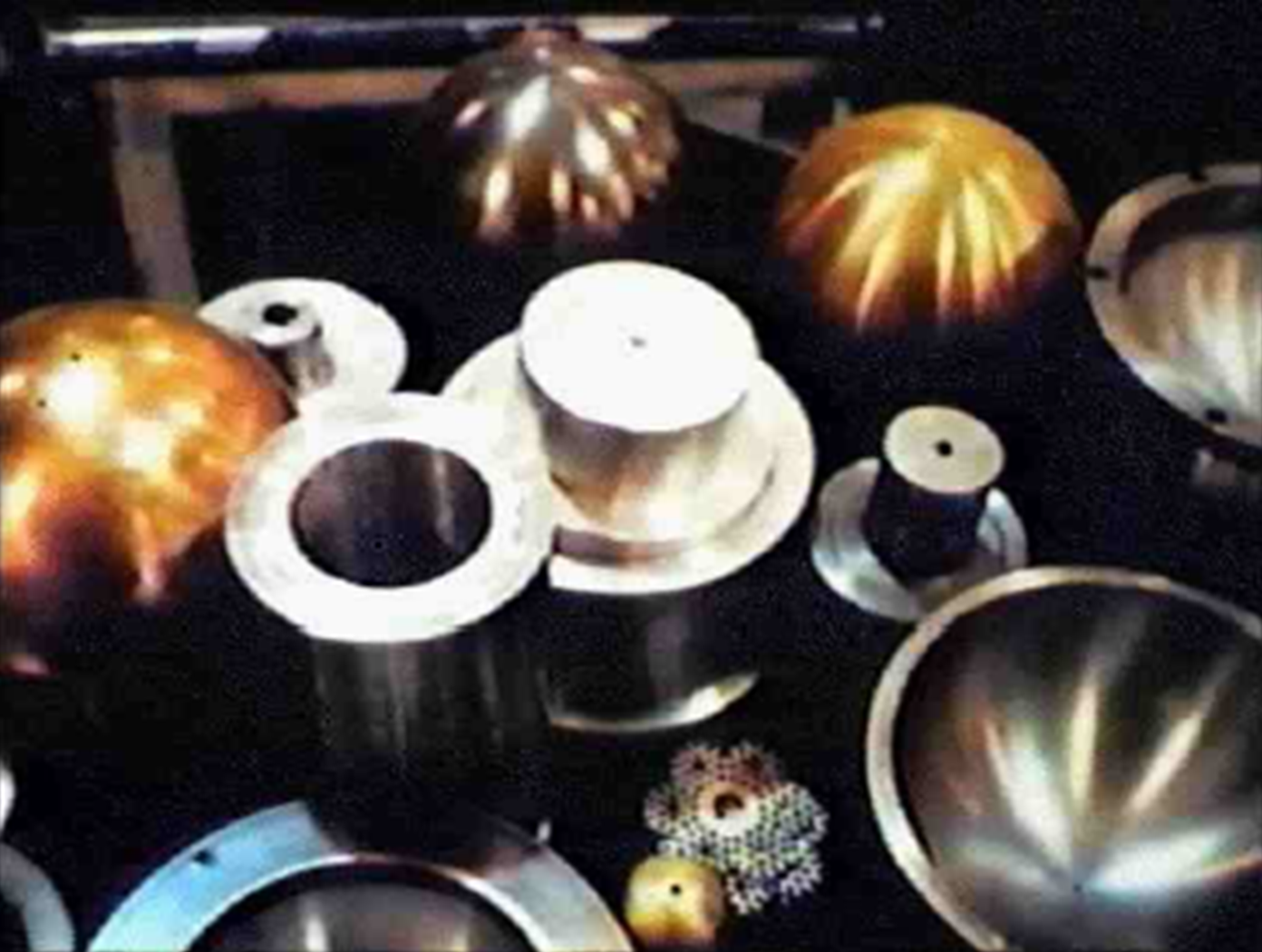
Internal nuclear components of the B61 bomb.

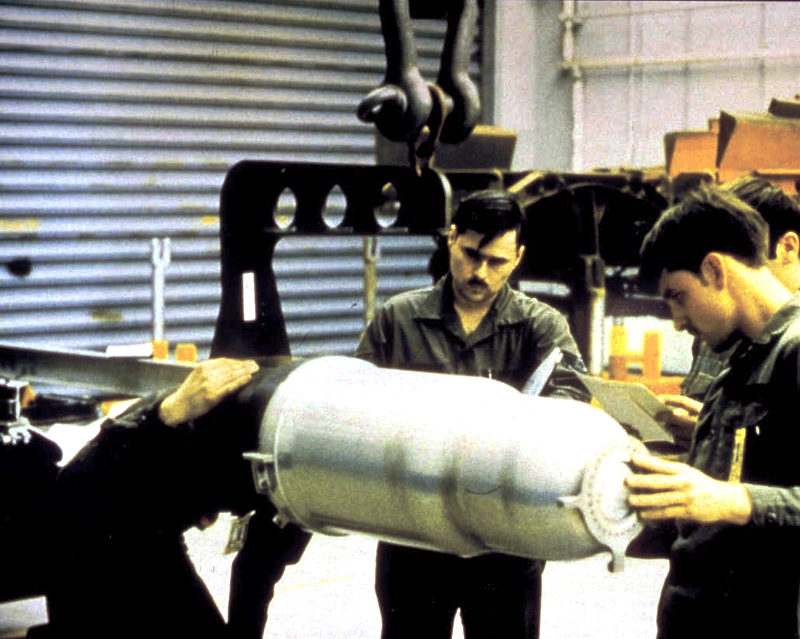
A W80-1 ALCM cruise missile warhead

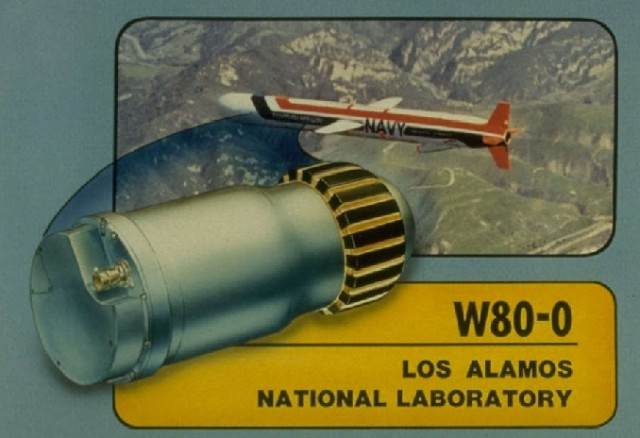
A W80-0 SLCM cruise missile warhead

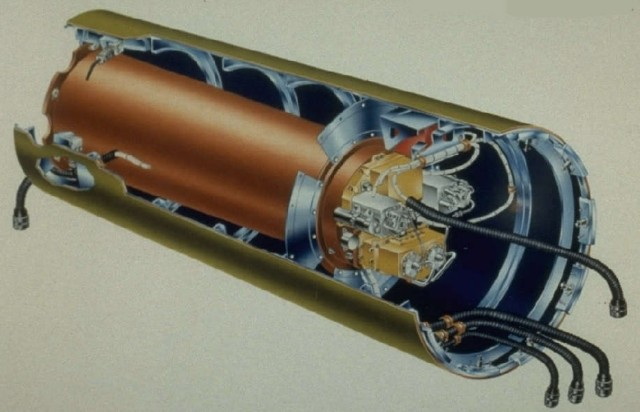
A DOE drawing of the W85 Pershing-II IRBM warhead.

== See also ==
- List of nuclear weapons
