= John O. Miner =

United States Navy officer (1910–1999)

- Born: June 22, 1910; Cedar Rapids, Iowa, U.S.
- Died: April 21, 1999 (aged 88)
- Military career
- Allegiance: United States
- Branch: United States Navy
- Rank: Rear Admiral
- Commands: USS Tingey (DD-539); USS Wisconsin (BB-64)
- Conflicts: World War II; Korean War
- Awards: Silver Star

John Odgers Miner (June 22, 1910 – April 21, 1999) was a rear admiral in the United States Navy.

== Biography ==
Miner was born in Cedar Rapids, Iowa in 1910. He died on April 21, 1999.

== Career ==
Miner graduated from the United States Naval Academy in 1931. After graduation, he would be assigned to the USS Maryland (BB-46). Later, he was assigned to the USS Utah (BB-31), USS Minneapolis (CA-36) and USS Cushing (DD-376), before becoming Executive Officer of the USS Meade (DD-602) during World War II.

Later in the war, Miner became the first commander of the USS Tingey (DD-539). While in command of the Tingey, he was awarded the Silver Star for his service during a period of time that included participating in the Battle of the Philippine Sea and the Battle of Leyte Gulf. He also received a Letter of Commendation during his command.

After the war, he was the Commanding Officer of the USS Wisconsin (BB-64) and U.S. Naval Attaché in Rome, Italy.

Other awards he received include: the Legion of Merit, the Navy Commendation Medal, the American Defense Service Medal with award star, the American Campaign Medal, the Asiatic-Pacific Campaign Medal with five engagement stars, the World War II Victory Medal, the China Service Medal, the Navy Occupation Service Medal, the National Defense Service Medal, the United Nations Korea Medal, the Philippine Liberation Medal and the Order of Merit of the Italian Republic.
