= USS Allendale =

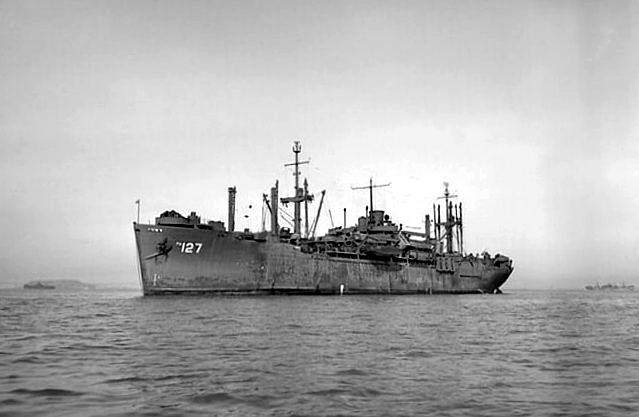

History

United States
- Name: Allendale
- Namesake: Allendale County, South Carolina
- Builder: California Shipbuilding Corporation
- Launched: 9 September 1944
- Commissioned: 22 November 1944
- Decommissioned: 14 March 1946
- Honors and awards: 1 Battle star
- Fate: Sold for scrap, 4 March 1988

General characteristics
- Class & type: Haskell-class attack transport
- Displacement: 6,873 tons (lt), 14,837 t (fl)
- Length: 455 ft (139 m)
- Beam: 62 ft (19 m)
- Draft: 24 ft (7 m)
- Propulsion: 1 × geared turbine, 2 × header-type boilers, 1 × propeller, designed 8,500 shp (6,338 kW)
- Speed: 17 knots (31 km/h; 20 mph)
- Boats & landing craft carried: 2 × LCM; 12 × LCVP; 3 × LCPL
- Capacity: Troops: 86 officers, 1,475 enlisted; Cargo: 150,000 cu ft, 2,900 tons
- Complement: 56 officers, 480 enlisted
- Armament: 1 × 5"/38 dual-purpose gun; 4 × twin 40 mm guns; 10 × single 20 mm guns; late armament, add 1 × 40 mm quad mount

USS Allendale (APA-127) was a Haskell-class attack transport in service with the United States Navy from 1944 to 1946. She was scrapped in 1988.

== History ==
Allendale was of the VC2-S-AP5 Victory ship design type and was named for Allendale County, South Carolina. She was laid down under a United States Maritime Commission contract (MCV hull 43) on 1 July 1944 at Wilmington, Los Angeles, by the California Shipbuilding Corp.; launched on 9 September 1944; sponsored by Mrs. Frank Hill; acquired by the Navy on 21 November 1944; and placed in commission on 22 November 1944 at San Pedro, Los Angeles.

The new attack transport was assigned to Transport Division 57, Transport Squadron 19, Pacific Fleet. She held a series of training exercises along the California coast before sailing for Hawaii early in January 1945. The vessel reached Pearl Harbor on the 10th and commenced a series of training exercises in the local operating area which lasted into late March. After taking on troops and cargo, she set sail on 22 March for the Philippine Islands; stopped en route at Eniwetok, Ulithi, and Kossol Roads, Palau Islands; and reached Leyte on 16 March.

There, Allendale began preparations for the upcoming Ryūkyū invasion. She sortied on the 27th with Task Unit 51.13.24, arrived in the outer transport area on 1 April, and began lowering her boats early that morning. In spite of frequent Japanese air harassment, all her cargo had been successfully discharged by the 9th. That day, Allendale shaped a course for Saipan and reached that island on 13 April. Two days later, she got underway for Pearl Harbor and ultimately sailed on to San Francisco, California.

Reaching the west coast on 5 May, the transport began loading equipment, troops, and supplies earmarked for bases on Leyte. She got underway on 17 May and made port calls at Pearl Harbor, Eniwetok, and Ulithi before reaching San Pedro Bay on 10 June. The ship discharged her passengers and cargo and, on the 19th, sailed for New Guinea.

Upon arriving in Oro Bay on 24 June, the transport embarked troops and supplies for transportation to the Philippines. After making an intermediate stop at Hollandia, New Guinea, on 1 July, Allendale pushed on to Manila, where she arrived on the 8th. When her passengers had disembarked, the vessel shaped a course back toward the United States. She spent one week at Eniwetok in mid-July and then sailed directly to San Diego, California, arriving there on 4 August.

Allendale was at San Diego when word of the Japanese capitulation was flashed around the world. On 21 August, she sailed with units of the occupation forces destined for Honshū Island, Japan. The ship paid visits to Pearl Harbor and Saipan before touching at Wakayama on 27 September. She sent Army troops ashore to serve in the occupation forces and then sailed on 1 October for Leyte. There, she embarked personnel of the X Army Corps and headed back to Japan. She arrived in Hiro Wan, Honshū, on 21 October and discharged her passengers.

Allendale left Japan on 27 October and commenced the voyage back to the United States. She touched at Samar, Philippines, on 1 November and embarked returning servicemen for passage to the west coast. The vessel arrived in San Francisco Bay on 22 November and soon thereafter began unloading her passengers. She entered drydock at the Hunters Point Naval Shipyard on the 27th for repairs.

In early January 1946, Allendale got underway for the east coast. After transiting the Panama Canal, the transport arrived in Norfolk, Virginia, on 30 January. She was decommissioned there on 14 March 1946 and was transferred to the Maritime Commission on 20 March 1946 for layup in the National Defense Reserve Fleet at James River, Virginia. Her name was struck from the Navy list on 28 March 1946.

=== Fate ===
In 1954 Allendale was withdrawn from the Reserve Fleet as part of a Repair Program, GAA-Grace, and then returned. Put on the list to be scrapped, she was restored to retention status on 1 July 1970. She was transferred to Crest Tankers, Inc. in connection with the trade in of ST Beaujolais, O.N. 267198, for upgrading the Reserve Fleet. On 4 March 1988 she was sold to C.J.W. Shipping and Trading, to be scrapped in Taiwan. At 0930 EST, on 23 November 1988 she was withdrawn from the Reserve Fleet and sent to the breaker's yard.

== Awards ==
Allendale earned one battle star for her World War II service
