= Medial rhombic triacontahedron =

Polyhedron with 30 faces

Medial rhombic triacontahedron
Type	Star polyhedron
Face	
Elements	F = 30, E = 60; V = 24 (χ = −6)
Symmetry group	I_{h}, [5,3], *532
Index references	DU_{36}
dual polyhedron	Dodecadodecahedron

3D model of a medial rhombic triacontahedron

In geometry, the medial rhombic triacontahedron (or midly rhombic triacontahedron) is a nonconvex isohedral polyhedron. It is a stellation of the rhombic triacontahedron, and can also be called small stellated triacontahedron. Its dual is the dodecadodecahedron.

Its 24 vertices are all on the 12 axes with 5-fold symmetry (i.e. each corresponds to one of the 12 vertices of the icosahedron). This means that on each axis there is an inner and an outer vertex. The ratio of outer to inner vertex radius is $\varphi \approx 1.618$, the golden ratio.

It has 30 intersecting rhombic faces, which correspond to the faces of the convex rhombic triacontahedron. The diagonals in the rhombs of the convex solid have a ratio of 1 to $\varphi$. The medial solid can be generated from the convex one by stretching the shorter diagonal from length 1 to $\varphi^3 \approx 4.236$. So the ratio of rhomb diagonals in the medial solid is 1 to $\varphi^2 \approx 2.618$.

This solid is to the compound of small stellated dodecahedron and great dodecahedron what the convex one is to the compound of dodecahedron and icosahedron: The crossing edges in the dual compound are the diagonals of the rhombs. The faces have two angles of $\arccos(\frac{1}{3}\sqrt{5})\approx 41.810\,314\,895\,78^{\circ}$, and two of $\arccos(-\frac{1}{3}\sqrt{5})\approx 138.189\,685\,104\,22^{\circ}$. Its dihedral angles equal $\arccos(-\frac{1}{2})= 120^{\circ}$. Part of each rhomb lies inside the solid, hence is invisible in solid models.

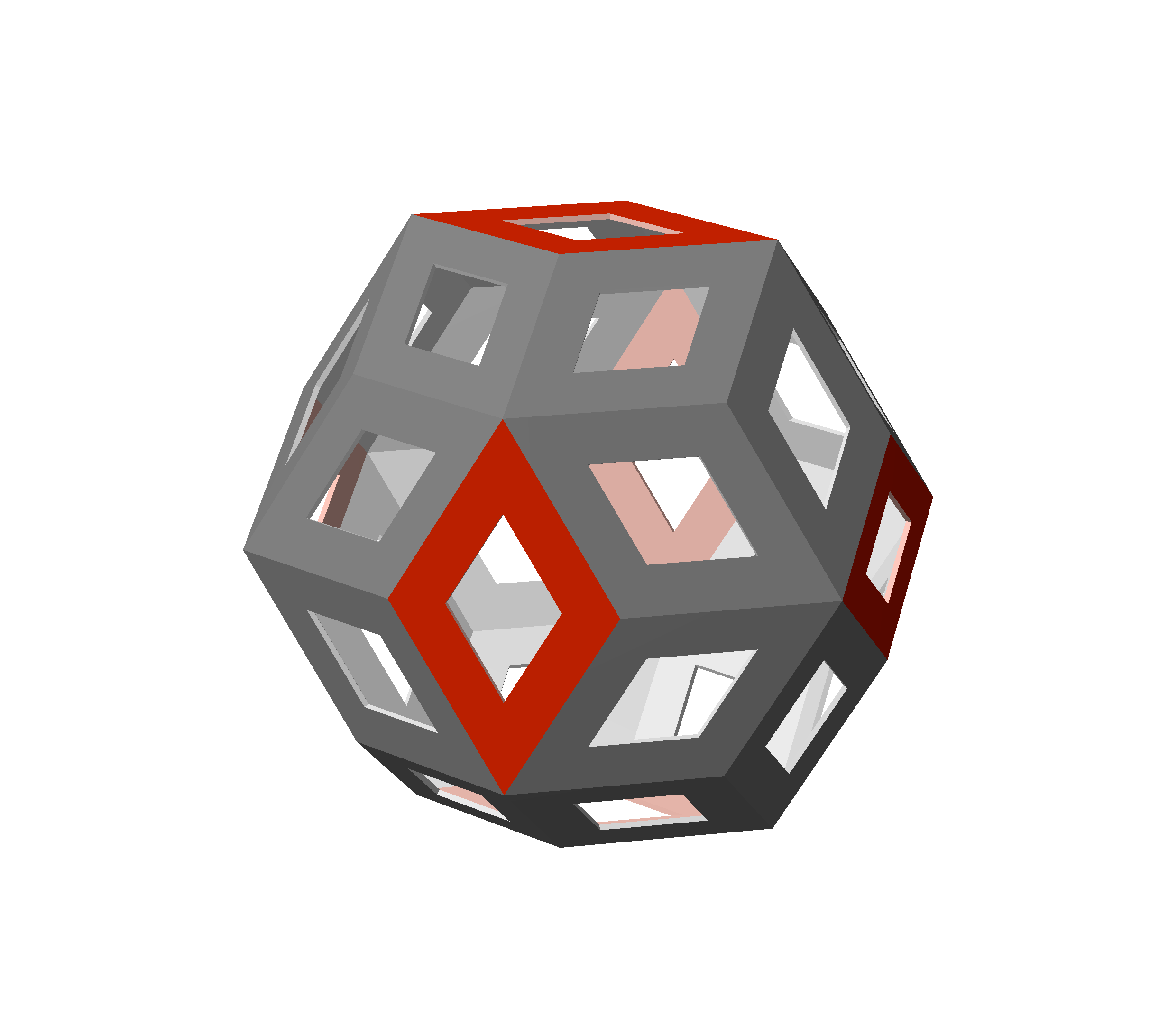
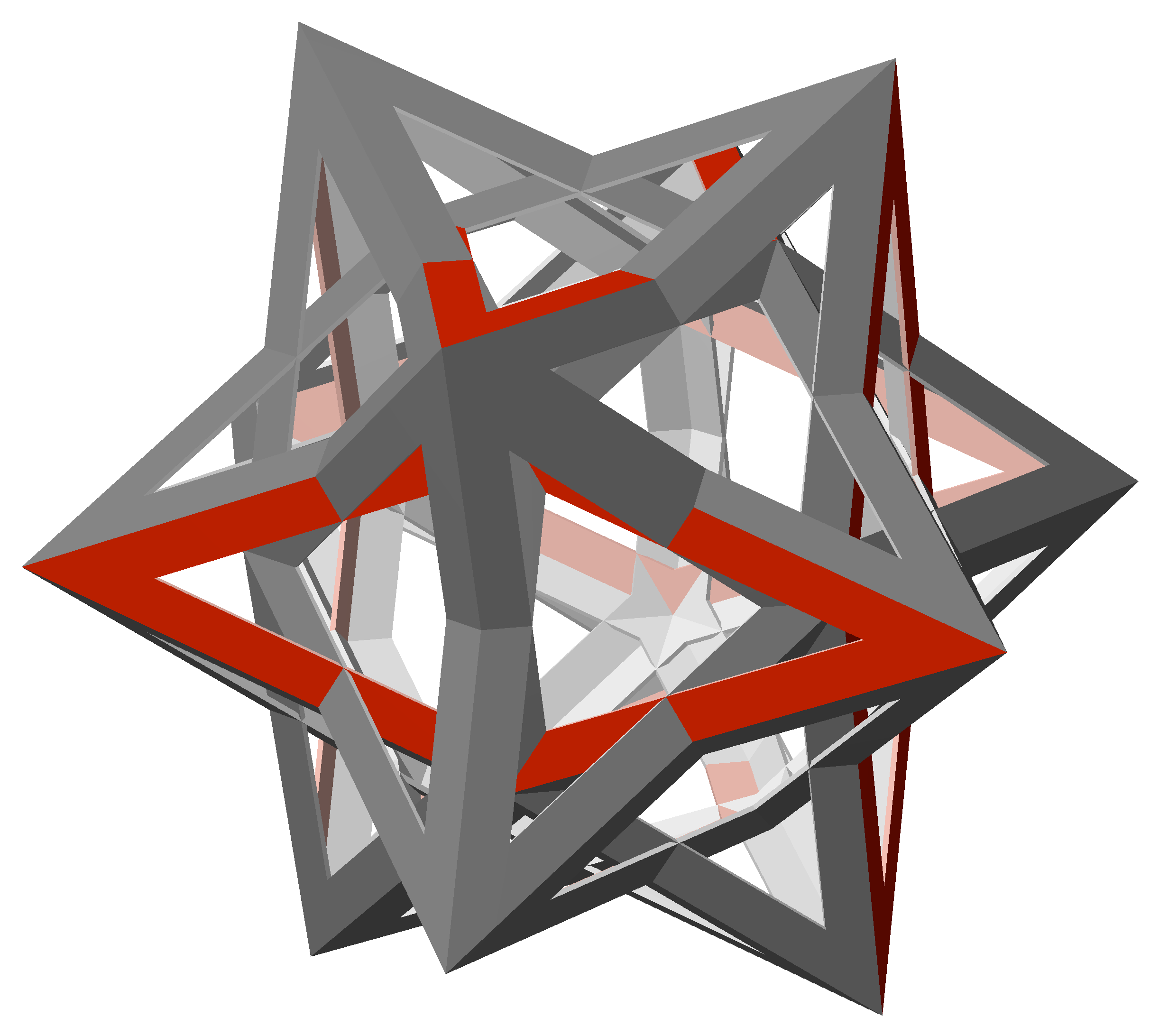
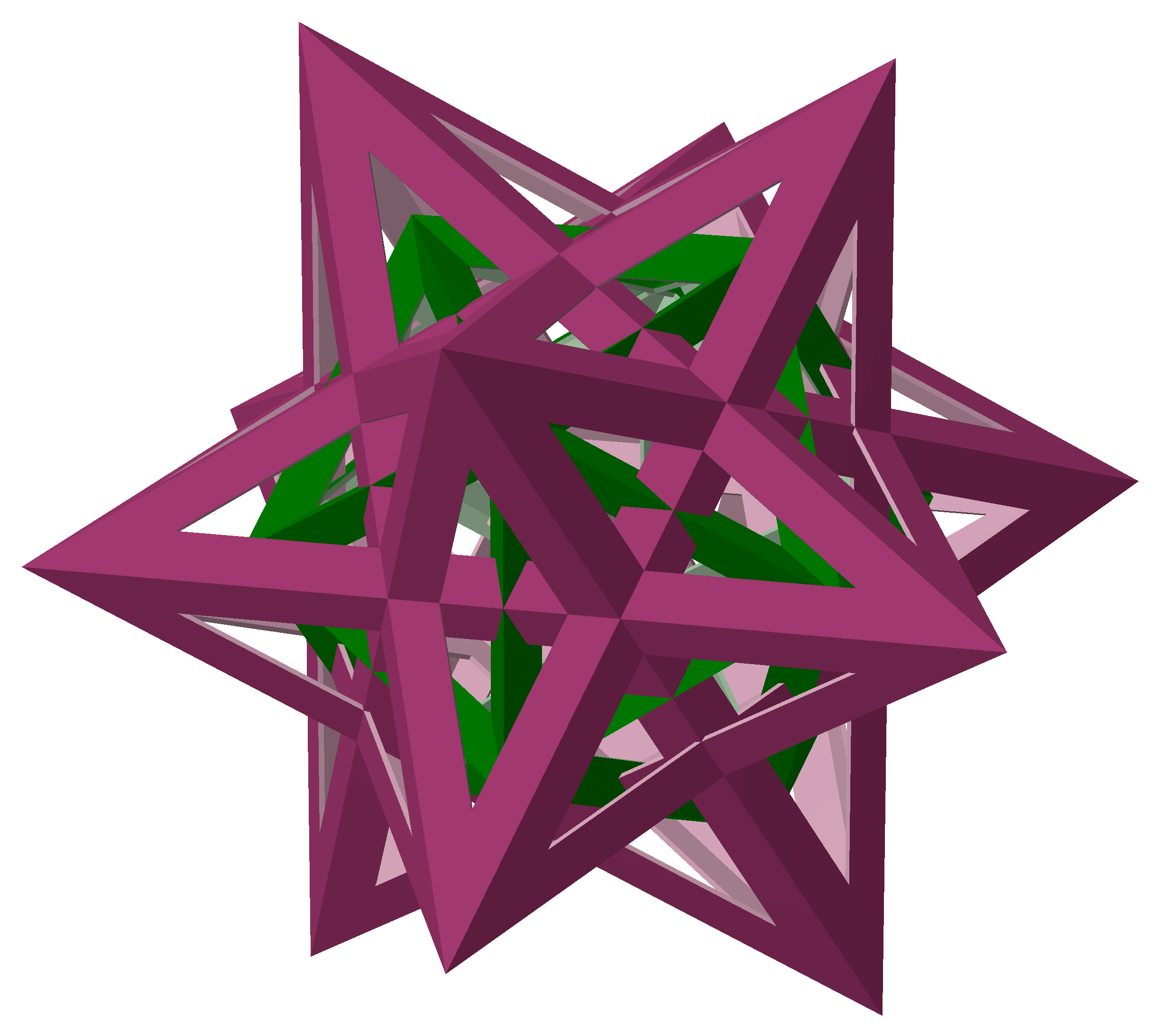
Convex and medial rhombic triacontahedron (both shown with pyritohedral symmetry) and on the right the dual compound of Kepler–Poinsot solids

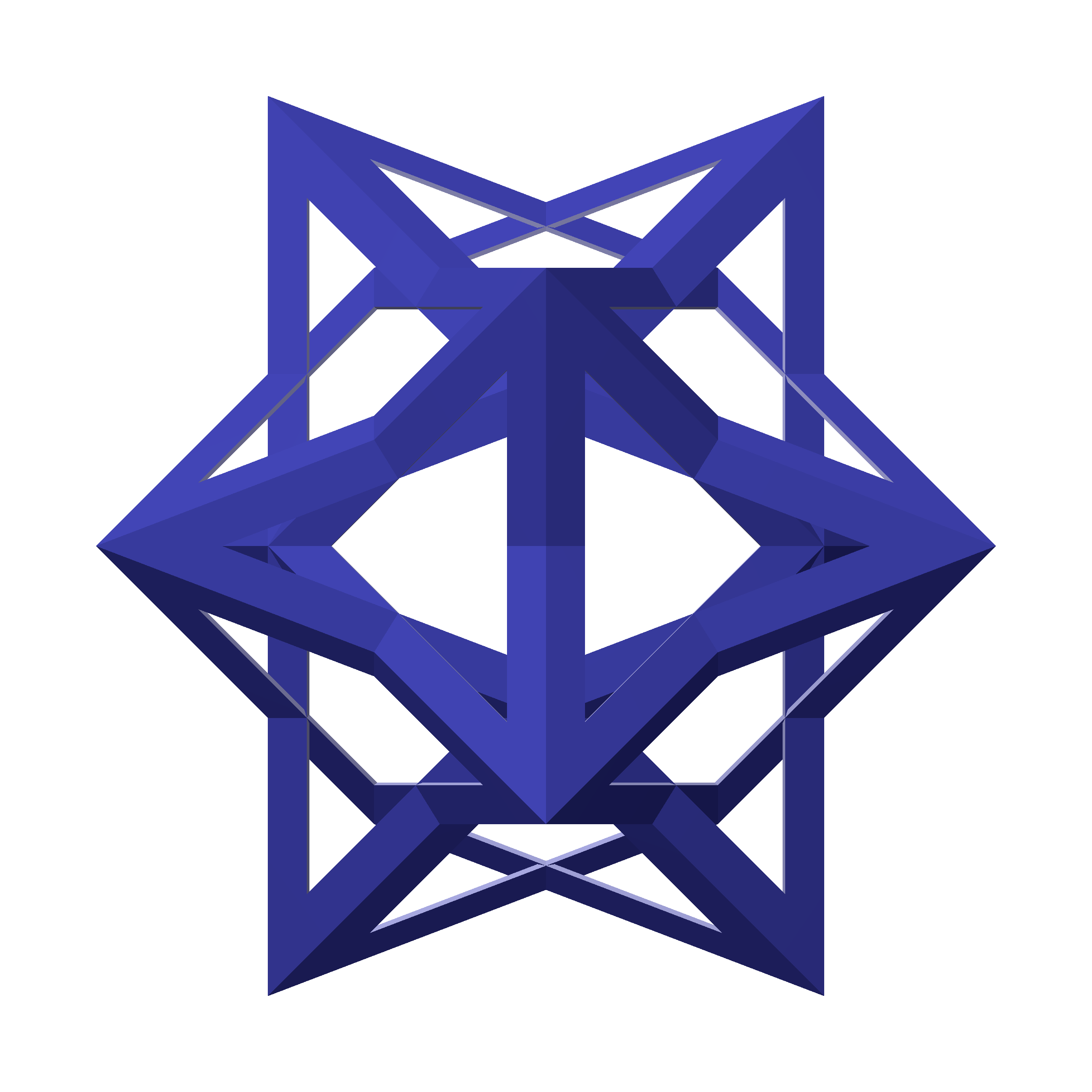
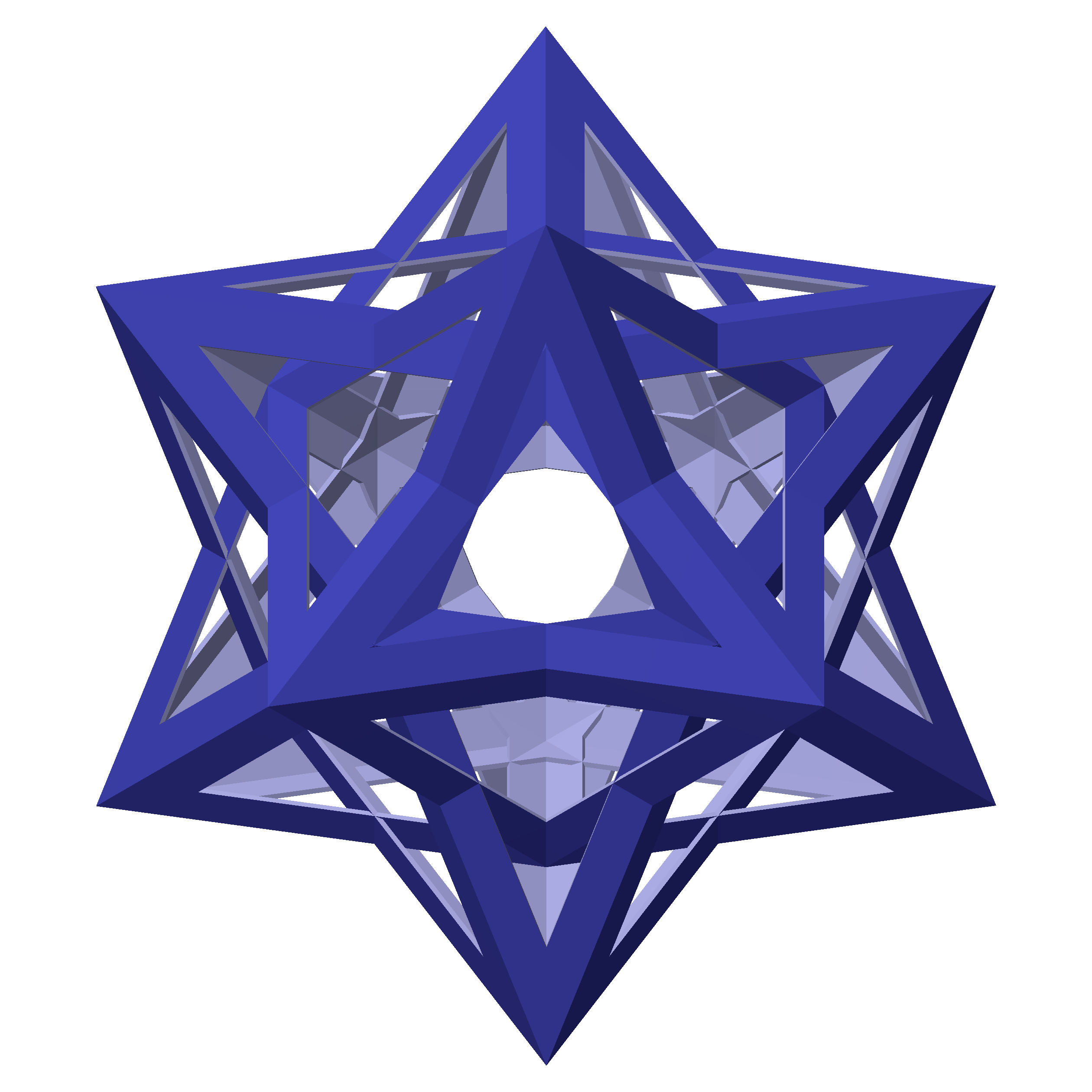
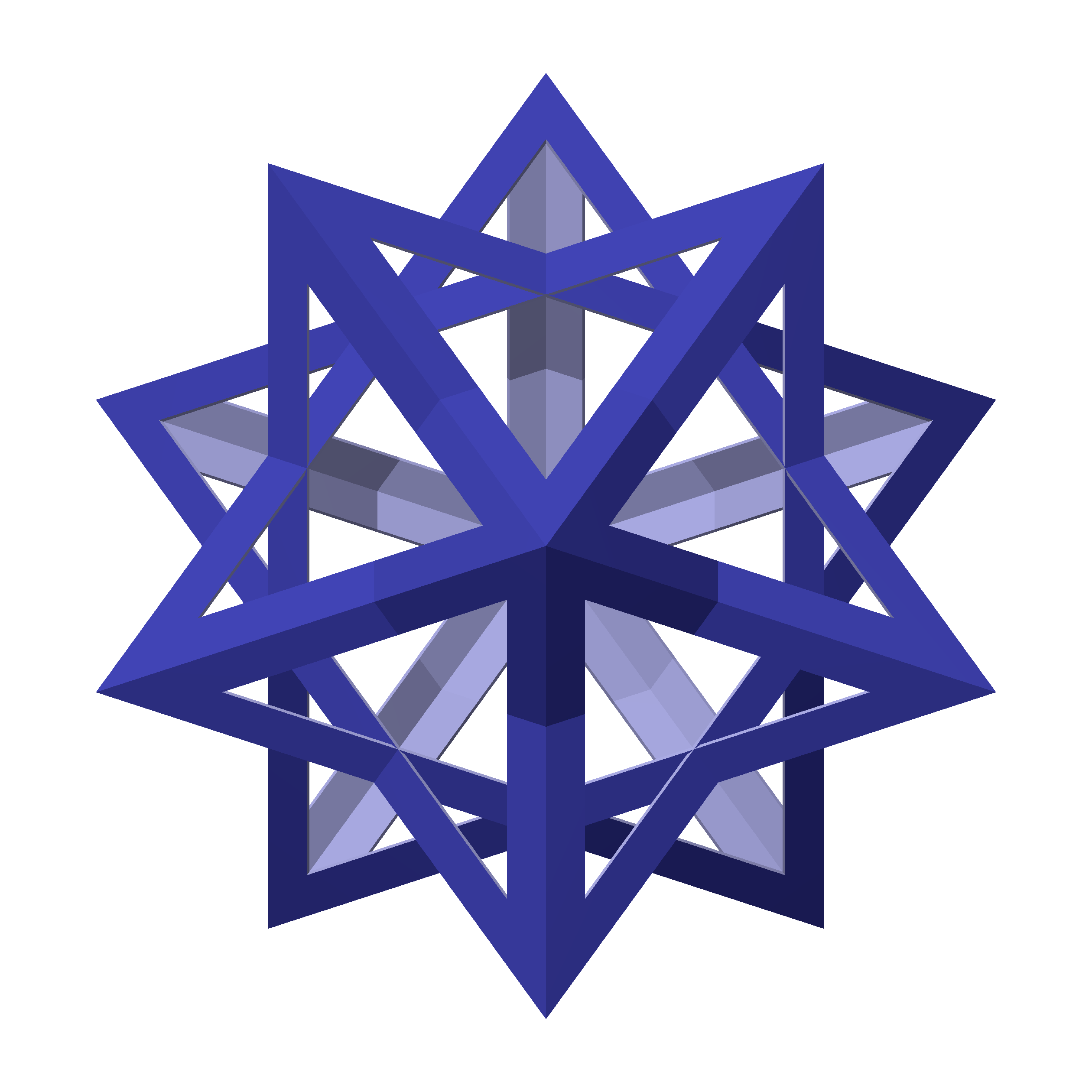
Orthographic projections from 2-, 3- and 5-fold symmetry axes

== Related hyperbolic tiling ==
It is topologically equivalent to a quotient space of the hyperbolic order-5 square tiling, by distorting the rhombi into squares. As such, it is topologically a regular polyhedron of index two:

Graph of the m. r. t. embedded in Bring's curve

order-5 square tiling

Note that the order-5 square tiling is dual to the order-4 pentagonal tiling, and a quotient space of the order-4 pentagonal tiling is topologically equivalent to the dual of the medial rhombic triacontahedron, the dodecadodecahedron.

== See also ==
- Great rhombic triacontahedron
- Great triambic icosahedron
