= USS Tingey (DD-539) =

Fletcher-class destroyer

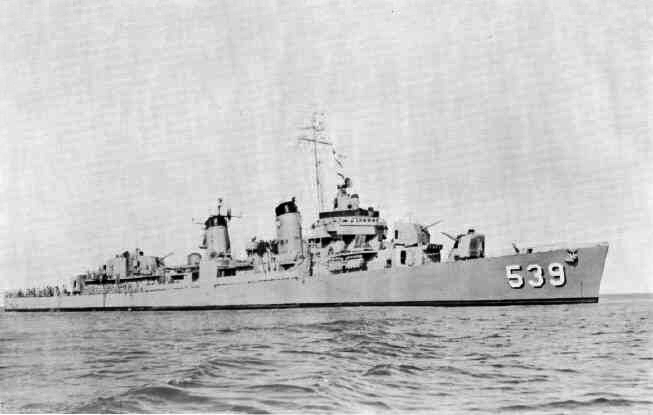
- USS Tingey (DD-539) in the 1950s

History
- Namesake: Thomas Tingey
- Builder: Bethlehem Shipbuilding Corporation, San Francisco, California
- Laid down: 22 October 1942
- Launched: 28 May 1943
- Commissioned: 25 November 1943
- Decommissioned: 30 November 1963
- Stricken: 1 November 1965
- Fate: Sunk as target, May 1966

General characteristics
- Class & type: Fletcher-class destroyer
- Displacement: 2,050 tons
- Length: 376 ft 6 in (114.7 m)
- Beam: 39 ft 8 in (12.1 m)
- Draft: 17 ft 9 in (5.4 m)
- Propulsion: 60,000 shp (45 MW); 2 propellers
- Speed: 35 knots (65 km/h; 40 mph)
- Range: 6500 nmi. (12,000 km) @ 15 kt
- Complement: 329
- Armament: 5 × single Mk 12 5 in (127 mm)/38 guns; 5 × twin 40 mm (1.6 in) Bofors AA guns; 7 × single 20 mm (0.8 in) Oerlikon AA guns; 2 × quintuple 21 in (533 mm) torpedo tubes; 6 × single depth charge throwers; 2 × depth charge racks

USS Tingey (DD-539) was a Fletcher-class destroyer of the United States Navy. She was the third Navy ship to be named for Commodore Thomas Tingey (1750–1829).

Tingey was laid down on 22 October 1942 by the Bethlehem Steel Co., San Francisco, Calif.; launched on 28 May 1943; sponsored by Mrs. Garry Owen; and commissioned on 25 November 1943, Commander John O. Miner in command.

== World War II ==
Following shakedown off the west coast, Tingey departed San Francisco for the Pacific theater on 2 February 1944. The destroyer participated in exercises out of Pearl Harbor in February and March before screening a convoy en route to the Marshalls early in April. On 13 April, she sortied Majuro to join Rear Admiral Marc A. Mitscher's Fast Carrier Task Force (then designated Task Force 58). Later that month, while supporting carrier strikes on Eton and Dublon in the Truk Islands, Tingey suffered casualties during an engagement with Japanese aircraft.

Tingey continued on her mission acting as a member of the destroyer screen for Battleship Division 7. On 1 May, Tingey participated in the bombardment of Tumu Point to eliminate the site as a Japanese submarine and air base. On 29 April, Tingey continued screening duties for the task force while one of its cruiser units bombarded Satawan Island.

On 15 May, Tingey sortied Majuro in company with R.Adm. Alfred E. Montgomery's carrier task group and set course for Marcus and Wake Islands. Early in June, she steamed as a member of Task Force 58 (TF 58) for the Philippine Sea. During the following week, she operated in the vicinity of Saipan and Tinian participating in the Battle of the Philippine Sea. The carriers of the group launched strike after strike against Guam and Rota and decimated the massed attacks of enemy aircraft flung at them by Japanese Admiral Jisaburo Ozawa in the 19 June battle, later known as "the Great Marianas Turkey Shoot". Also in June, Tingey accompanied the group as it conducted air strikes on Pagan Island.

On the last day of June, Tingey sortied from Eniwetok with R.Adm. Ralph E. Davison's carrier task group for air strikes in the Bonins. She then rejoined the 5th Fleet off Saipan to support invasion forces in the Marianas. On 21 July, the carriers launched 10 strikes in support of the assault on Guam. After replenishment at Saipan, Tingey set course for the northern Palaus where she supported carrier air sweeps and strikes. She then assumed screening duties for R.Adm. Gerald F. Bogan's carrier task group as it conducted strikes on enemy concentrations on Guam.

After mooring at Eniwetok for upkeep and inspection, Tingey resumed her duties late in August. During the first two weeks of September, she supported carrier strikes on Leyte, Bulan, and Samar, before proceeding to Luzon. There, the destroyer encountered enemy night attacks while supporting carrier strikes on the Philippines. After replenishment at Tanapag Harbor, Tingey got underway for Ulithi where she conducted antisubmarine patrols.

In October, Tingey continued operations with Mitscher's fast carrier force. On 17 and 18 October, she supported strikes on Visayan Island, and, on the 24th, the carriers launched strikes in the Battle of the Sibuyan Sea. Steaming off San Bernardino Strait on the night of 25/26 October, Tingey joined with the battleships and cruisers of the task group to sink the Japanese destroyer Nowaki. This ill-fated ship was a straggler from Admiral Takeo Kurita's Center Force retiring from the Battle off Samar. Following this engagement, Tingey steamed northward for strikes on Manila Bay; then returned in the first week of November for additional strikes on Luzon and Bicol.

Departing Ulithi on 14 November, Tingey steamed for the Philippines. En route, she weathered a typhoon which swallowed up three destroyers on 18 December. After a fruitless search for survivors, the carrier group aborted planned strikes on Luzon because of bad weather and rough seas and returned to Ulithi.

On 30 December 1944, the task group conducted strikes on Formosa and Luzon. In January 1945, Tingey proceeded to the South China Sea for strikes on French Indochina and Hong Kong before returning to Ulithi. In February, she participated in Operation Jamboree strikes on Tokyo Bay and experienced enemy air attacks as she performed screening duties in support of the Iwo Jima landings. She accompanied carriers making strikes on Kyūshū and Okinawa in March. When enemy aircraft bombed carrier USS Franklin (CV-13) on the 19th, causing fire and extensive damage, Tingey rescued survivors and escorted the battered vessel to Ulithi.

During April and May, enemy air activity was frequent as Tingey screened carriers providing direct air support for ground troops on Okinawa. Tingey made three assists, splashed a Japanese raider, and rescued downed fliers from USS Essex (CV-9) and USS Bunker Hill (CV-17). Under constant enemy air attacks, Tingey continued her duties off Okinawa in May, making one quick run north to Kyūshū on 13 May for air strikes. Tingey spent most of June undergoing upkeep in the Philippines before getting underway for San Francisco. On 9 July, she arrived at Mare Island Naval Shipyard where she remained until the end of the war. Tingey was decommissioned in March 1946.

== Korean War ==
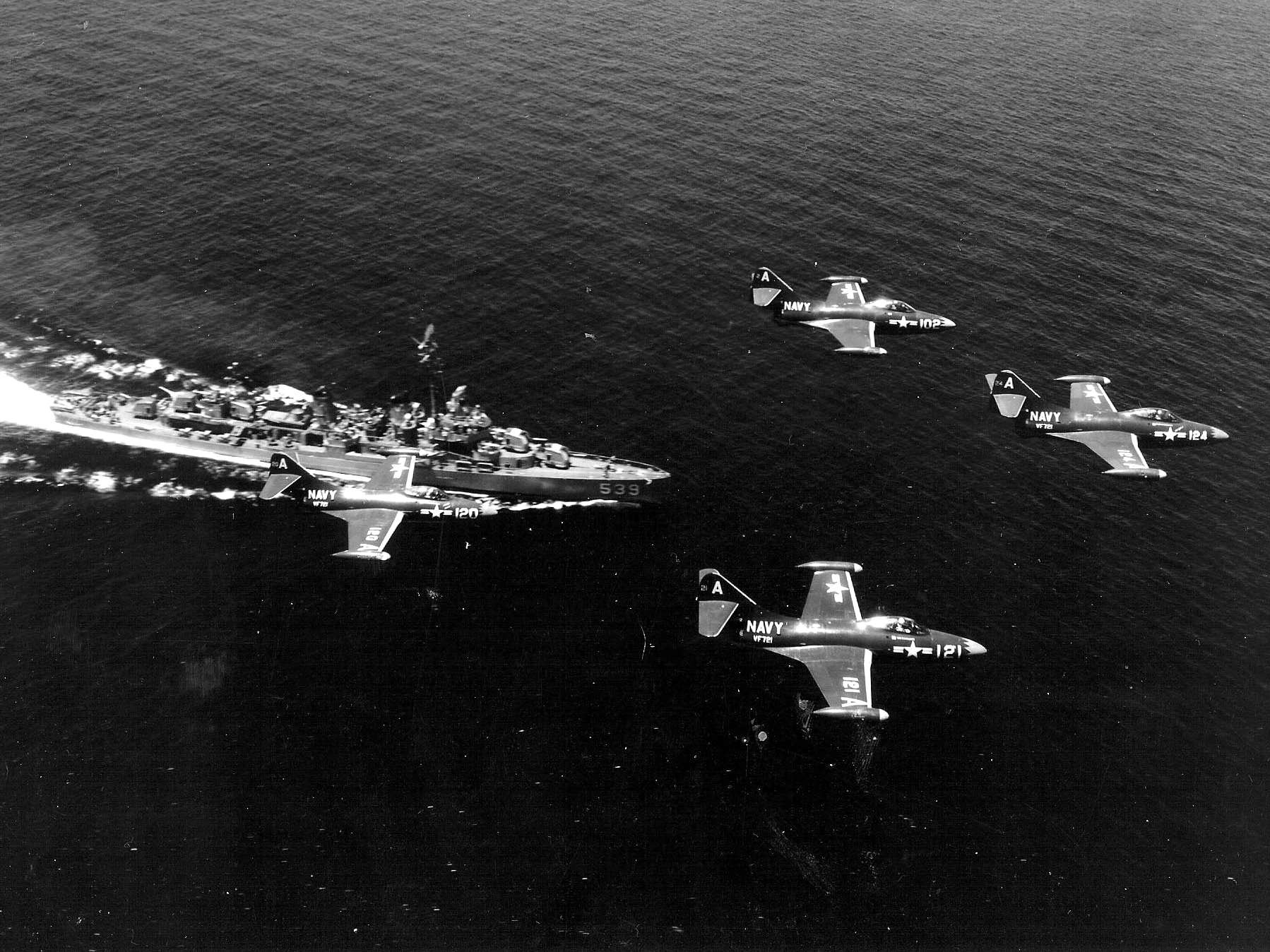
F9F-2Bs flying over Tingey off Korea, in 1951.

The outbreak of the Korean War led to Tingey's recommissioning on 27 January 1951. After two months of operations out of San Diego, she was soon taking part in American efforts in the Korean War. Following a brief period at Pearl Harbor in May, Tingey steamed via Sasebo and Yokosuka for Korea. From August to December 1951, she operated off Wonsan on the east coast of Korea supplying gunfire support for United Nations ground troops, conducting anti-mining and shore bombardment patrols off Hungnam, and destroying many enemy targets. In December Tingey provided support for Republic of Korea (ROK) commando raids before getting underway for Yokosuka on 4 December.

Tingey spent the first six months of 1952 in San Diego; then steamed on 11 July, via Midway and Pearl Harbor, toward Korea. On 13 August, Tingey was again off the east coast of Korea providing gunfire support for ROK forces ashore. She also engaged in antisubmarine searches and conducted night patrols between Nan Do and the Korean peninsula. During this six-month tour off Korea, Tingey completed successful fire missions on enemy troops, railroads, and gun and mortar positions. She departed Korea on 26 January 1953 and arrived at San Diego on 16 February.

In mid-August, she got underway again for WestPac, arriving off Korea on 10 November 1953. During this tour, Tingey operated out of Sasebo, Japan conducted missions off the east and west coasts of Korea; and visited Taiwan and the Philippines before she returned to San Diego in April 1954.

== 1954–1963 ==
Tingey again departed San Diego on 16 November 1954 for operations in the East China Sea and the Sea of Japan. During this tour, she plied the waters of Taiwan Strait to protect Taiwan against invasion and also conducted surveillance of shipping. Tingey trained Chinese Nationalist personnel and visited Bangkok and Manila before setting course for Hong Kong on 27 January. Between January and April, she operated off Taiwan, Korea, and Okinawa, then steamed in May for San Diego. In the following three years Tingey served additional tours in the Far East. Returning from WestPac in 1957, she operated out of San Diego as a naval reserve training ship until 1962 when SEATO exercises sent Tingey to the Far East once more. After completing these exercises, she returned to San Diego to resume reserve training cruises.

== Fate ==
On 1 August 1963, Tingey collided with USS Vammen (DE-644) off southern California. Tingey sustained no casualties and returned to San Diego despite severe flooding and damage. She was decommissioned on 30 November 1963, and her name struck from the Navy List on 1 November 1965. She was sunk as a target off San Francisco in May 1966.

Prior to sinking, Tingey's bow section was removed and grafted onto the USS Brinkley Bass (DD-887), from a different destroyer class, who lost her bow in a collision with USS Waddell (DDG-24).

== Honors ==
Tingey received eight battle stars for World War II service and five battle stars for the Korean War.
