= W69 =

American nuclear warhead

The W69 was a United States nuclear warhead used in the AGM-69 SRAM (Short-Range Attack Missile).

It was designed in the early 1970s and entered the U.S. stockpile in 1972. The weapon was retired between 1991 and 1994. About 1,500 warheads were produced.

The weapons were partially dismantled by 1999 at the Pantex Plant, with only the canned subassemblies (CSA) of the secondary stage of the weapons remaining. Dismantlement of the CSAs at the Y-12 National Security Complex began in 2012 and was completed by 2016.

The W69 warhead is believed to be derived from the B61 nuclear bomb design.

== Specifications ==
The W69 had a diameter of 15 inches (380 mm) and was 30 inches (760 mm) long. It weighed 275 pounds (125 kg). It had a yield of approximately 170 to 200 kilotonnes of TNT (710 to 840 TJ).

== See also ==
- List of nuclear weapons
- B61 Family
