= 31 great circles of the spherical icosahedron =

Geometric structure

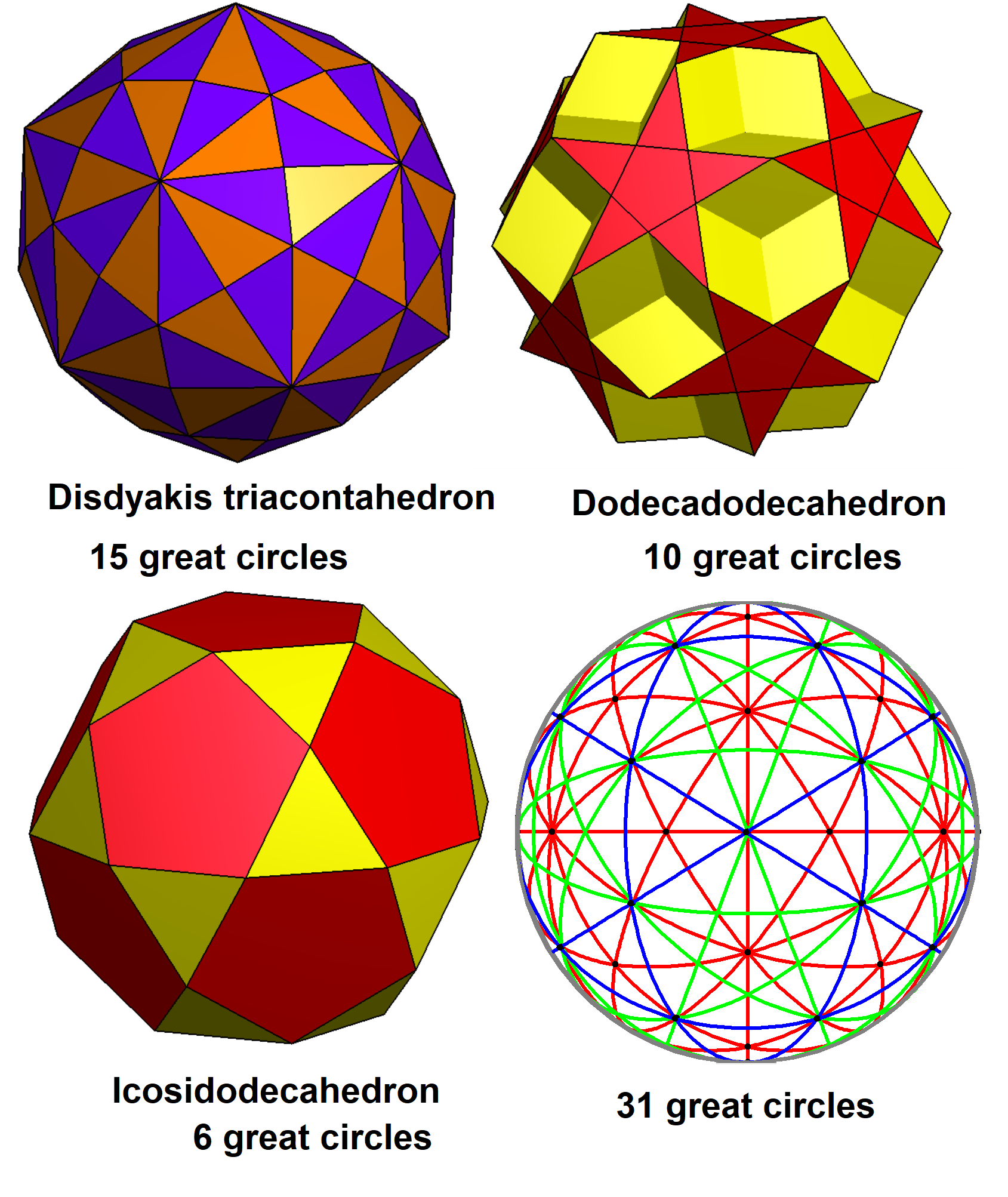
The 31 great circles can be seen as the union of edges in 3 polyhedra. The lower right image shows 15 red circles, 10 green circles, and 6 blue circles.

In geometry, the 31 great circles of the spherical icosahedron is an arrangement of 31 great circles in icosahedral symmetry. It was first identified by Buckminster Fuller and is used in construction of geodesic domes.

== Construction ==
The 31 great circles can be seen in 3 sets: 15, 10, and 6, each representing edges of a polyhedron projected onto a sphere. Fifteen great circles represent the edges of a disdyakis triacontahedron, the dual of a truncated icosidodecahedron. Six more great circles represent the edges of an icosidodecahedron, and the last ten great circles come from the edges of the uniform star dodecadodecahedron, making pentagrams with vertices at the edge centers of the icosahedron.

There are 62 points of intersection, positioned at the 12 vertices, and center of the 30 edges, and 20 faces of a regular icosahedron.

== Images ==
The 31 great circles are shown here in 3 directions, with 5-fold, 3-fold, and 2-fold symmetry. There are 4 types of right spherical triangles by the intersected great circles, seen by color in the right image.

5-fold	3-fold	2-fold	2-fold

== See also ==
- 25 great circles of the spherical octahedron
