= AGM-53 Condor =

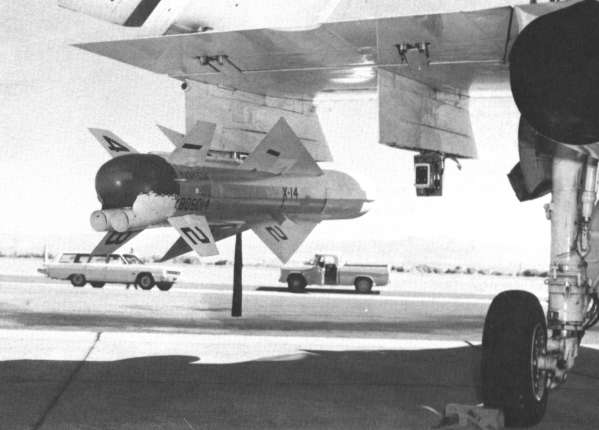
- AGM-53 Condor
- Type: Air-to-surface guided missile
- Place of origin: United States

Production history
- Manufacturer: Rockwell

Specifications
- Mass: 2,100 lb (950 kg)
- Length: 13 feet 10 inches (4.22 m)
- Diameter: 17 inches (43 cm)
- Wingspan: 4 feet 5 inches (1,350 mm)
- Warhead: 630 pounds (290 kg) linear shaped charge warhead or W73 nuclear warhead
- Engine: Rocketdyne MK 70 solid-fuel rocket
- Operational range: 60 nmi (69 mi; 110 km)
- Maximum speed: Mach 2.9
- Launch platform: Aircraft

In 1962, the U.S. Navy issued a requirement for a long-range high-precision air-to-surface missile. The missile, named the AGM-53A Condor, was to use a television guidance system with a data link to the launching aircraft similar to the system of the then projected AGM-62 Walleye.

== Development history ==
Because of numerous problems in the development phase, the first flight of an XAGM-53A missile did not occur before March 1970.

On 4 February 1971, in its first live warhead test, a Condor made a direct hit on the ex-US navy destroyer escort USS Vammen, while tests later that year demonstrated the ability to hit targets at a range of 30 nmi (35 mi; 56 km). The AGM-53 program was cancelled in March 1976. Its long range and potentially high precision made the Condor a very powerful weapon, but it was much more expensive than contemporary tactical air-to-ground weapons. The secure data link contributed a significant portion to total missile cost, and it certainly didn't help that this link was still somewhat unreliable.

== Description ==
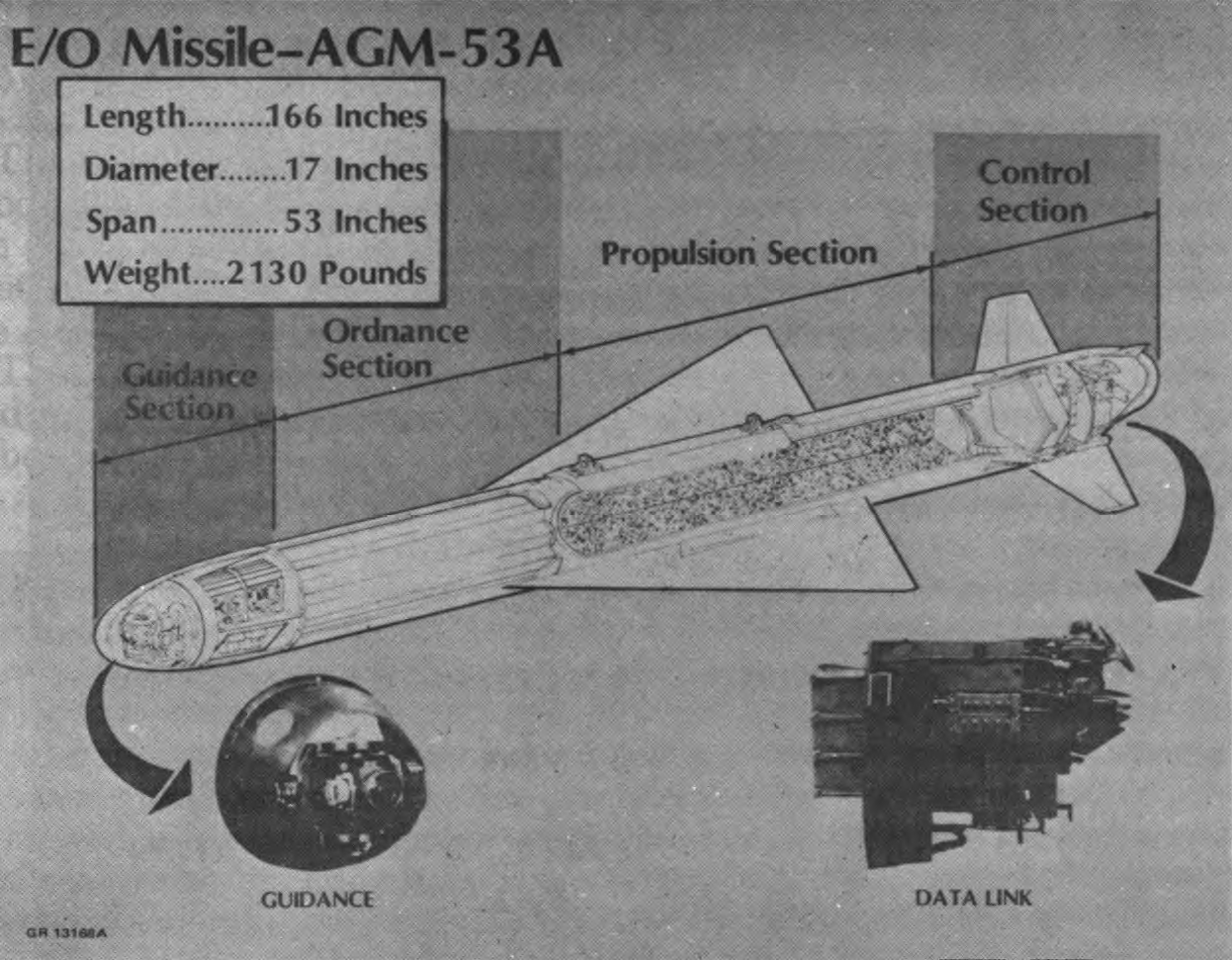
Diagram of the AGM-53A Condor tactical missile.

The Condor was to be a long-range missile to be used for high-precision stand-off attacks. The missile was launched by the strike aircraft from a distance of up to 60 nautical miles (110 km; 69 mi) to the general target area. When the AGM-53 approached the expected target position, the image of the TV camera in the missile's nose was transmitted back to the operator in the launching aircraft. The operator could switch between wide and narrow field-of-view images to find a suitable target.

As soon as a target for the missile had been selected, the operator could either fly the missile manually until impact, or lock the Condor on the target and rely on the missile's capability to home on the final aiming point. The Condor's linear shaped charge warhead detonated on impact.

A variant of the Condor was anticipated to carry the W73 nuclear warhead, a derivative of the B61 nuclear bomb. Details on the W73 are poorly documented, and it never entered production or service.

== Operators ==
- United States: The AGM-53 was cancelled before entering service.
