= W73 (nuclear warhead) =

Planned nuclear warhead design

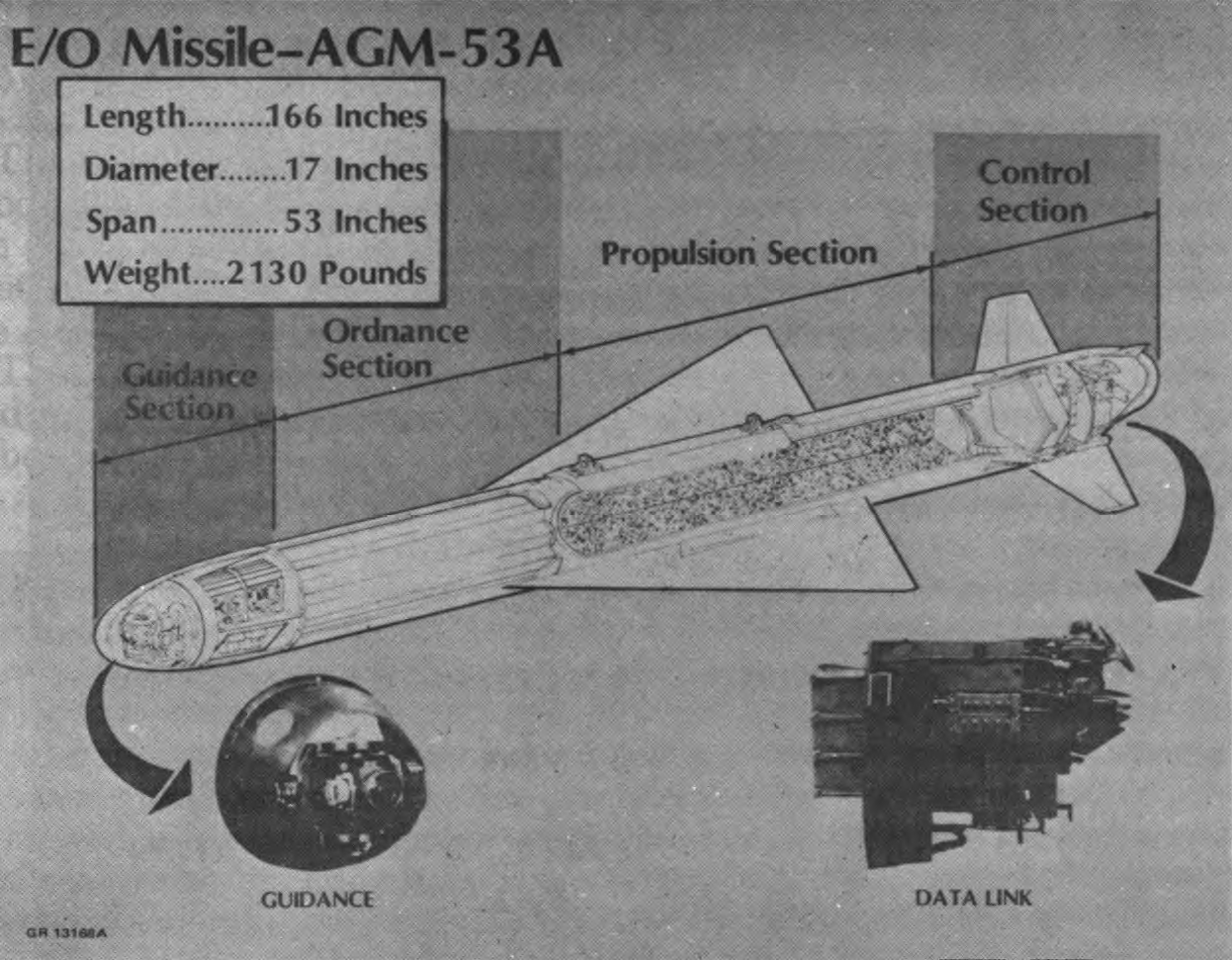
Diagram of the AGM-53A Condor tactical missile.

The W73 was a planned nuclear warhead for the AGM-53 Condor air to surface missile and designed by Los Alamos Scientific Laboratory (now Los Alamos National Laboratory). The W73 warhead was cancelled in 1970 in favor of a purely conventional warhead for Condor. Condor was approved for production in 1975 with an expected production run of 250 missiles, but was cancelled in early 1976 due to high cost.

The weapon was reportedly derived from the B61 nuclear bomb and had a diameter of 17 inches (430 mm).

Condor was to weigh 2,130 pounds (970 kg) at launch and carry a 286 kilograms (631 lb) warhead. It is unclear if the weight given is for the conventional or nuclear-armed version of the Condor.

== See also ==
- List of nuclear weapons
- B61 Family
