= ST Beaujolais =

History
- Name: Flying A New York (1954–); New York Getty; Beaujolais
- Owner: Tide Water Assoc. Oil (1954–); Crest Tankers, Inc.; MARAD (1988–2006); ESCO Marine, Inc. (2006–)
- Builder: Newport News Shipbuilding and Dry Dock
- Launched: 19 May 1954
- Identification: IMO number: 5116971; Official Number: 267198
- Fate: Sold for scrap 2006

General characteristics
- Tonnage: 17,054 GT
- Length: 628 ft (191 m) LOA
- Beam: 82.5 ft (25.1 m)
- Draft: 33.6 ft (10.2 m)
- Speed: 16 knots (30 km/h; 18 mph)

ST Beaujolais was a tanker built in March 1954 by Newport News Shipbuilding and Dry Dock for Tide Water Assoc. Oil and christened Flying A New York. The tanker was later owned by Crest Tankers, Inc. She then entered the National Defense Reserve Fleet at Beaumont, Texas on 29 October 1987. MARAD later gained title on 4 March 1988. In June 2006 she was finally sold for scrap to ESCO Marine, Inc.
