= AGM-69 SRAM =

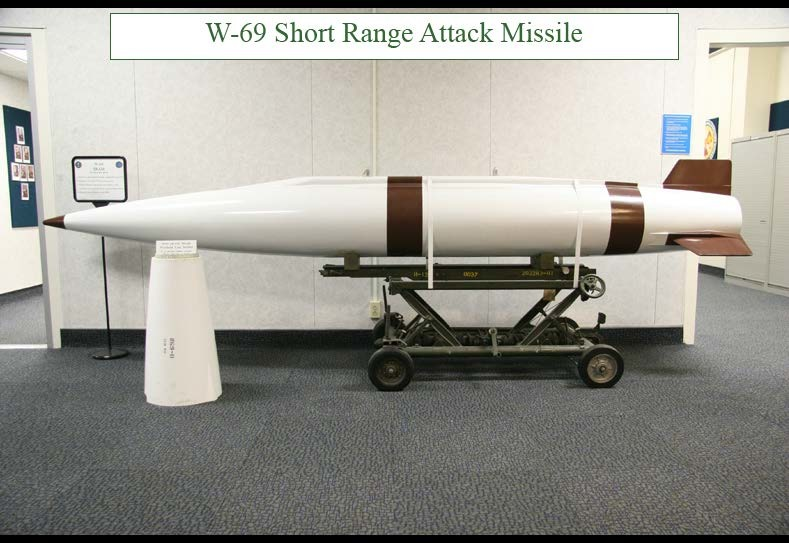
- SRAM missile carrying a W69 warhead
- Type: Nuclear air-to-surface missile
- Place of origin: United States

Service history
- In service: 1972–1993
- Used by: United States
- Wars: Cold War

Production history
- Designer: Boeing
- Designed: 1965
- Manufacturer: Boeing
- Unit cost: $592,000
- Produced: 1971–1975
- No. built: 1,500

Specifications
- Mass: 2,230 lb (1,010 kg)
- Length: 15 ft 10 in (4.83 m) w/ tail fairing, 14 ft 0 in (4.27 m) without
- Diameter: 17.5 in (0.44 m)
- Warhead: W69 nuclear warhead
- Blast yield: 170 to 200 kilotonnes of TNT (710 to 840 TJ)
- Engine: Lockheed SR75-LP-1 two-pulse solid-fueled rocket
- Operational range: 110 nautical miles (200 km)
- Maximum speed: Mach 3
- Guidance system: General Precision/Kearfott KT-76 Inertial measurement unit
- Accuracy: 1,400 ft (430 m)
- Transport: Airplane

The Boeing AGM-69 SRAM (Short-Range Attack Missile) was an air-to-surface missile with a nuclear warhead. It had a range of up to 110 nautical miles (200 km; 130 mi), and was intended to allow US Air Force strategic bombers to penetrate Soviet airspace by neutralizing surface-to-air missile defenses.

The SRAM was designed to replace the older AGM-28 Hound Dog standoff missile which was tasked with the same basic role. The Hound Dog was a very large missile that could only be carried in pairs by the B-52, so some aircraft were tasked with suppressing Soviet missile and radar sites while others would carry on to strike their strategic targets. The SRAM was so much smaller that a number could be carried along with other weapons, allowing a single aircraft to blast a nuclear path through to its targets.

The SRAM entered service in 1972 and was carried by a number of aircraft, including the B-52, FB-111A, and the B-1B. In September 1980 a ground fire raised concerns about the safety of the warhead, and in 1990 they were temporarily removed from service while safety checks were carried out. These revealed a number of the missiles' rocket motors had developed cracks that could have resulted in them exploding when launched.

The SRAM was removed from service in 1993. The weapon was to be replaced by the AGM-131 SRAM II and the new W89 warhead, but the program was terminated at the end of the Cold War.

== History ==
"SRAM: A Weapon For Strategic Bombers" (1970) - Official de-classified USAF AGM-69 SRAM information film-reel.

The Air Force had been considering the idea of a medium-range missile to attack air defense sites since the mid-1950s. This concept became more important with the Soviet introduction of the SA-2 missile, which presented a serious threat to the United States Air Force Strategic Air Command's (SAC) bomber fleet. The first attempt to address this role led to the GAM-67 Crossbow, which flew for the first time in 1956. However, the Crossbow's subsonic speed meant it could not get far enough ahead of the bomber to be useful. A supersonic development, the Longbow, was under development, but ultimately cancelled as well.

The role was finally filled by the AGM-28 Hound Dog, a much larger supersonic missile. The Hound Dog served the dual purpose of attacking defense sites as well as being a stand-off missile to use against strategic targets so that the bombers did not have to approach them. However, Hound Dog was so large that only two could be carried by a B-52, and only if it removed all other weapons. A more practical system specifically for the counter-defense role was highly desirable.

=== AGM-69A SRAM ===
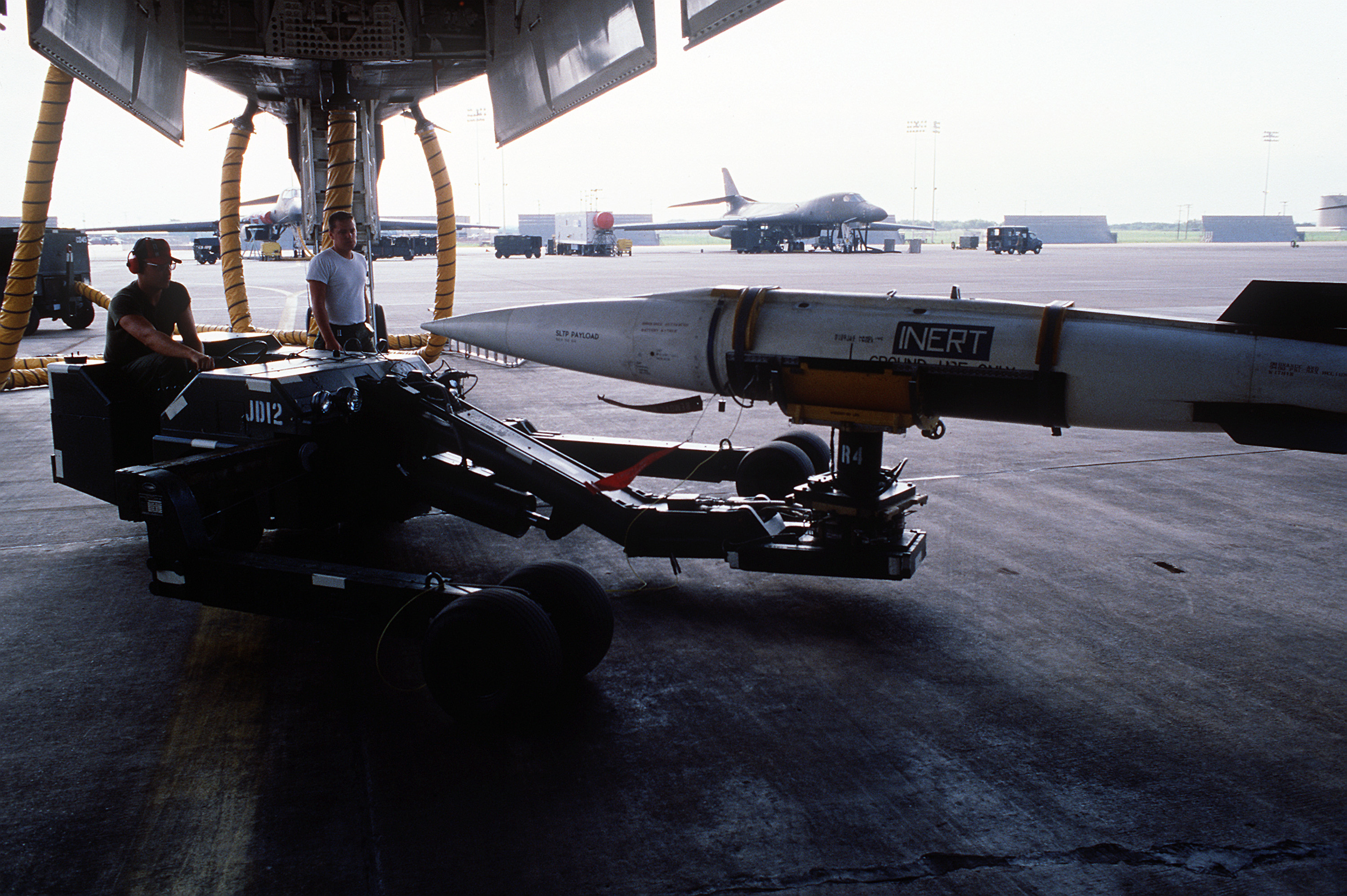
An AGM-69A SRAM being loaded into a B-1B bomb bay in 1987.

The requirement for the weapon was issued by the Strategic Air Command in 1964, and the resultant AGM-69A SRAM contract was awarded to Boeing in 1966. After delays and technical flaws during testing, it was ordered into full production in 1971 and entered service in August 1972. It was carried by the B-52, FB-111A, and, for a very short period starting in 1986, by B-1Bs based at Dyess AFB in Texas. SRAMs were also carried by the B-1Bs based at Ellsworth AFB in South Dakota, Grand Forks AFB in North Dakota, and McConnell AFB in Kansas up until late 1993.

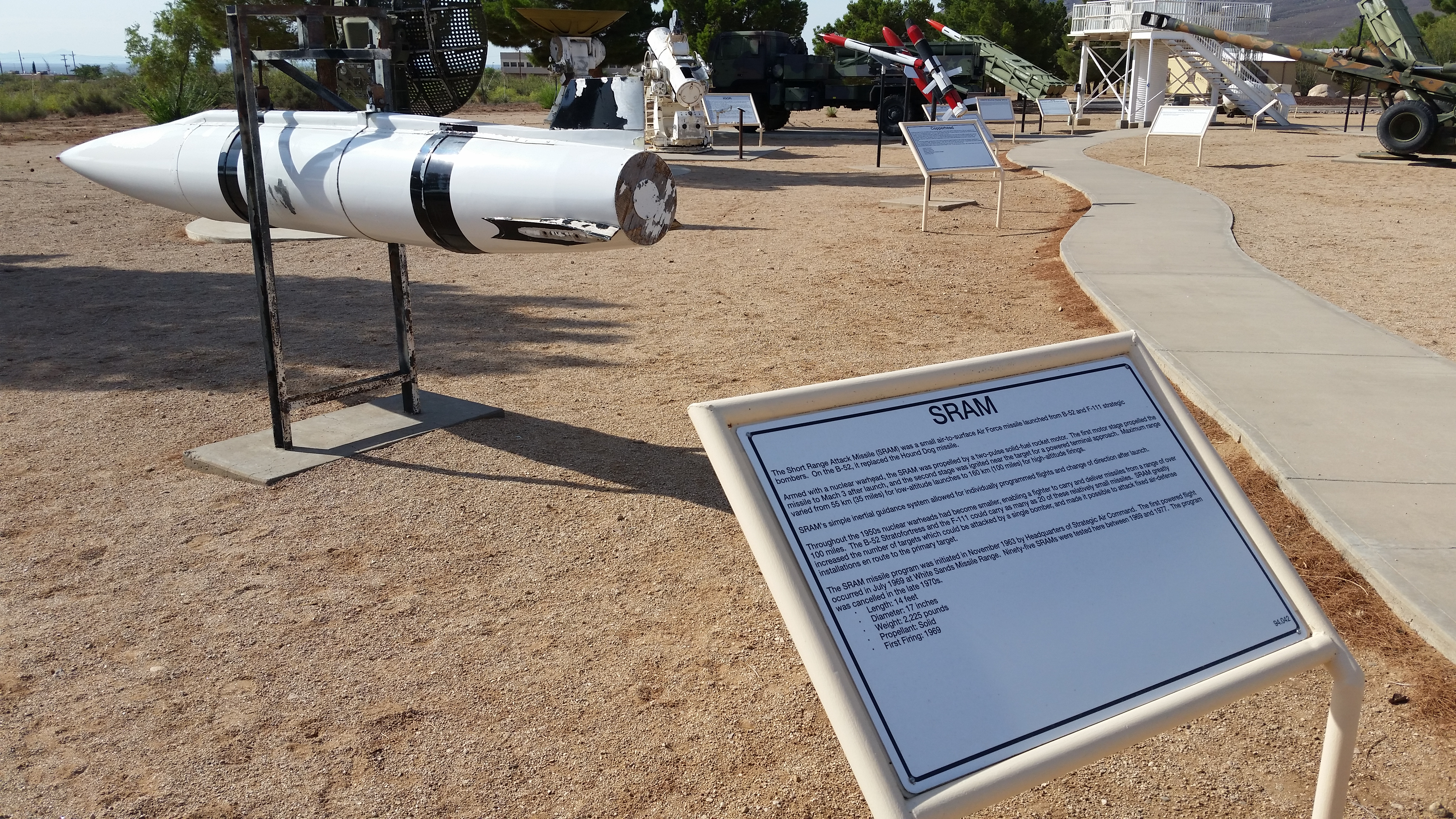
White Sands Missile Range Missile Park SRAM display.

SRAM had an inertial navigation system as well as a radar altimeter which enabled the missile to be launched in either a semi-ballistic or terrain-following flight path. The SRAM was also capable of performing one "major maneuver" during its flight which gave the missile the capability of reversing its course and attacking targets that were behind it, sometimes called an "over-the-shoulder" launch. The missile had a circular error probable (CEP) of about 1,400 feet (430 m) and a maximum range of 110 nautical miles (200 km). The SRAM carried the W69 warhead with an estimated yield of 170 to 200 kilotonnes of TNT (710 to 840 TJ).

The SRAM missile was completely coated with 0.8 in (2.0 cm) of soft rubber, used to absorb radar energy and also dissipate heat during flight. The three fins on the tail were made of a phenolic material, also designed to minimize any reflected radar energy. All electronics, wiring, and several safety devices were routed along the top of the missile, inside a raceway.

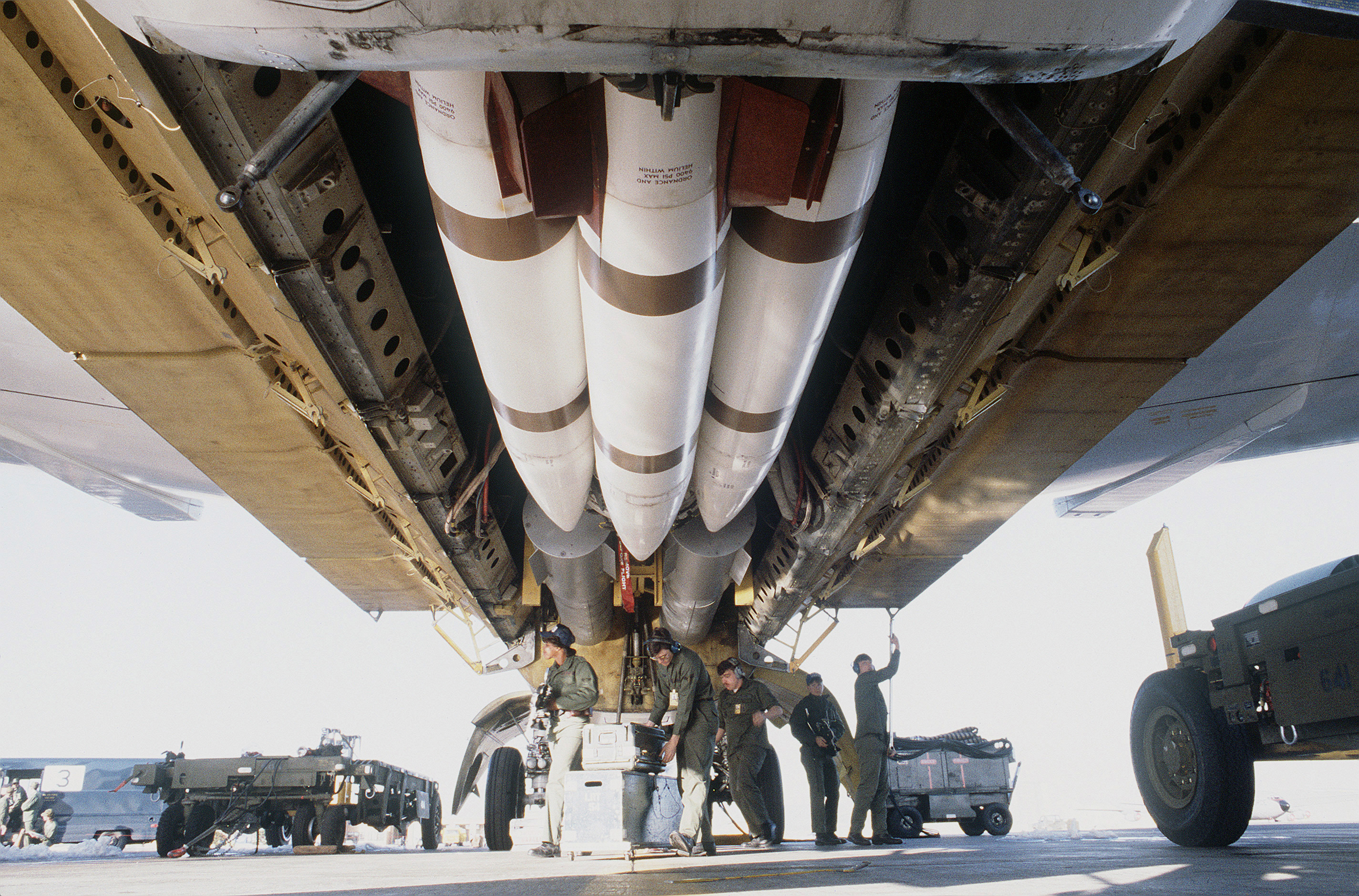
Bomb bay of a B-52H at Ellsworth Air Force Base in 1984 with AGM-69 SRAMs in the foreground.

On the B-52 SRAMs were carried externally on two wing pylons (six missiles on each pylon) and internally on an eight-round rotary launcher mounted in the bomb bay; maximum load-out was 20 missiles. Each of the B-1B's 3 internal stores bays could each contain a rotary launcher capable of holding up to 8 missiles, for a maximum loadout of 24 missiles. The smaller FB-111A could carry two missiles internally and four more missiles under the aircraft's swing-wing. The externally mounted missiles required the addition of a tailcone to reduce aerodynamic drag during supersonic flight of the aircraft. Upon rocket motor ignition, the missile tailcone was blown away by the exhaust plume.

About 1,500 missiles were built at a cost of about $592,000 each by the time production ended in 1975. The Boeing Company sub-contracted with the Lockheed Propulsion Company for the propellants, which subsequently closed with the end of the SRAM program.

=== AGM-69B SRAM ===
An upgraded AGM-69B SRAM was proposed in the late 1970s, with an upgraded motor to be built by Thiokol and a W80 warhead, but it was cancelled by President Jimmy Carter (along with the B-1A) in 1978. Various plans for alternative guidance schemes, including an anti-radar seeker for use against air defense installations and even a possible air-to-air missile version, came to nothing.

=== AGM-131 SRAM II ===
A new weapon, the AGM-131 SRAM II, began development in 1981, intended to arm the resurrected B-1B, but it was cancelled in 1991 by President George Bush, along with most of the U.S. Strategic Modernization effort (including Peacekeeper Mobile (Rail) Garrison, Midgetman small ICBM and Minuteman III modernization) in an effort by the U.S. to ease nuclear pressure on the disintegrating Soviet Union.

=== 1990s ===
In June 1990, Defense Secretary Dick Cheney ordered the missiles removed from bombers on alert pending a safety inquiry. A decade earlier in September 1980, a B-52H on alert status at Grand Forks AFB in northeastern North Dakota experienced a wing fire that burned for three hours, fanned by evening winds of 26 mph (42 km/h). The wind direction was parallel to the fuselage, which likely had SRAMs in the main bay. Eight years later, weapons expert Roger Batzel testified to a closed U.S. Senate hearing that a change of wind direction could have led to a conventional explosion and a widespread scattering of radioactive plutonium.

The AGM-69A was retired in 1993 over growing concerns about the safety of its warhead and rocket motor. There were serious concerns about the solid rocket motor, when several motors suffered cracking of the propellant, thought to occur due to the hot/cold cycling year after year. Cracks in the propellant could cause catastrophic failure once ignited.

== Specifications ==
- Length: 15 ft 10 in (4.83 m) with tail fairing, 14 ft 0 in (4.27 m) without tail fairing
- Diameter: 17.5 in (0.44 m).
- Wing span: 2 ft 6 in (0.76 m).
- Launch weight: 2,230 lb (1,010 kg).
- Maximum speed: Mach 3.5
- Maximum range: 35–105 miles (56–169 km) depending on flight profile
- Powerplant: 1 × Lockheed SR75-LP-1 two stage solid-fuel rocket motor
- Guidance: General Precision/Kearfott KT-76 IMU and Stewart-Warner radar altimeter
- CEP: 1,400 ft (430 m)
- Warhead: W69 thermonuclear 170 to 200 kilotonnes of TNT (710 to 840 TJ)
