= Depth charge =

Anti-submarine weapon

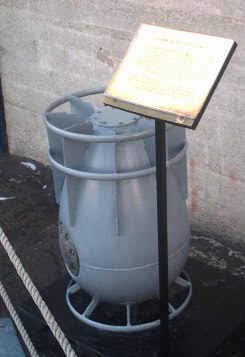
US World War II Mark IX depth charge. Streamlined and equipped with fins to impart rotation, allowing it to fall in a straight trajectory with less chance of drifting off target. This depth charge contained 200 lb (91 kg) of Torpex.

A depth charge is an anti-submarine warfare (ASW) weapon designed to destroy submarines by detonating in the water near the target and subjecting it to a destructive hydraulic shock. Most depth charges use high explosives with a fuze set to detonate the charge, typically at a specific depth from the surface. Depth charges can be dropped by ships (typically fast, agile surface combatants such as destroyers or frigates), patrol aircraft and helicopters.

Depth charges were developed during World War I, and were one of the first viable methods of attacking a submarine underwater. They were widely used in World War I and World War II, and remained part of the anti-submarine arsenals of many navies during the Cold War, during which they were supplemented, and later largely replaced, by anti-submarine homing torpedoes.

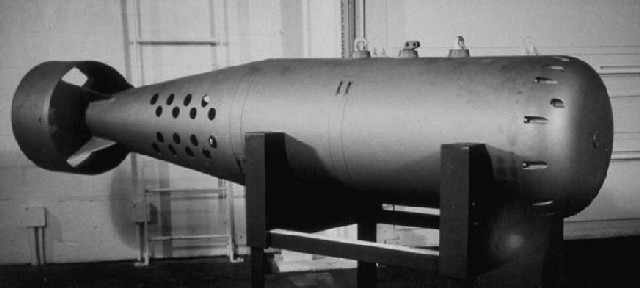
The Mk 101 Lulu was a US nuclear depth bomb operational from 1958 to 1972

A depth charge fitted with a nuclear warhead is also known as a "nuclear depth bomb". These were designed to be dropped from a patrol plane or deployed by an anti-submarine missile from a surface ship, or another submarine, located a safe distance away. By the late 1990s all nuclear anti-submarine weapons had been withdrawn from service by the United States, the United Kingdom, France, Russia and China. They have been replaced by conventional weapons whose accuracy and range had improved greatly as ASW technology progressed.

== History ==
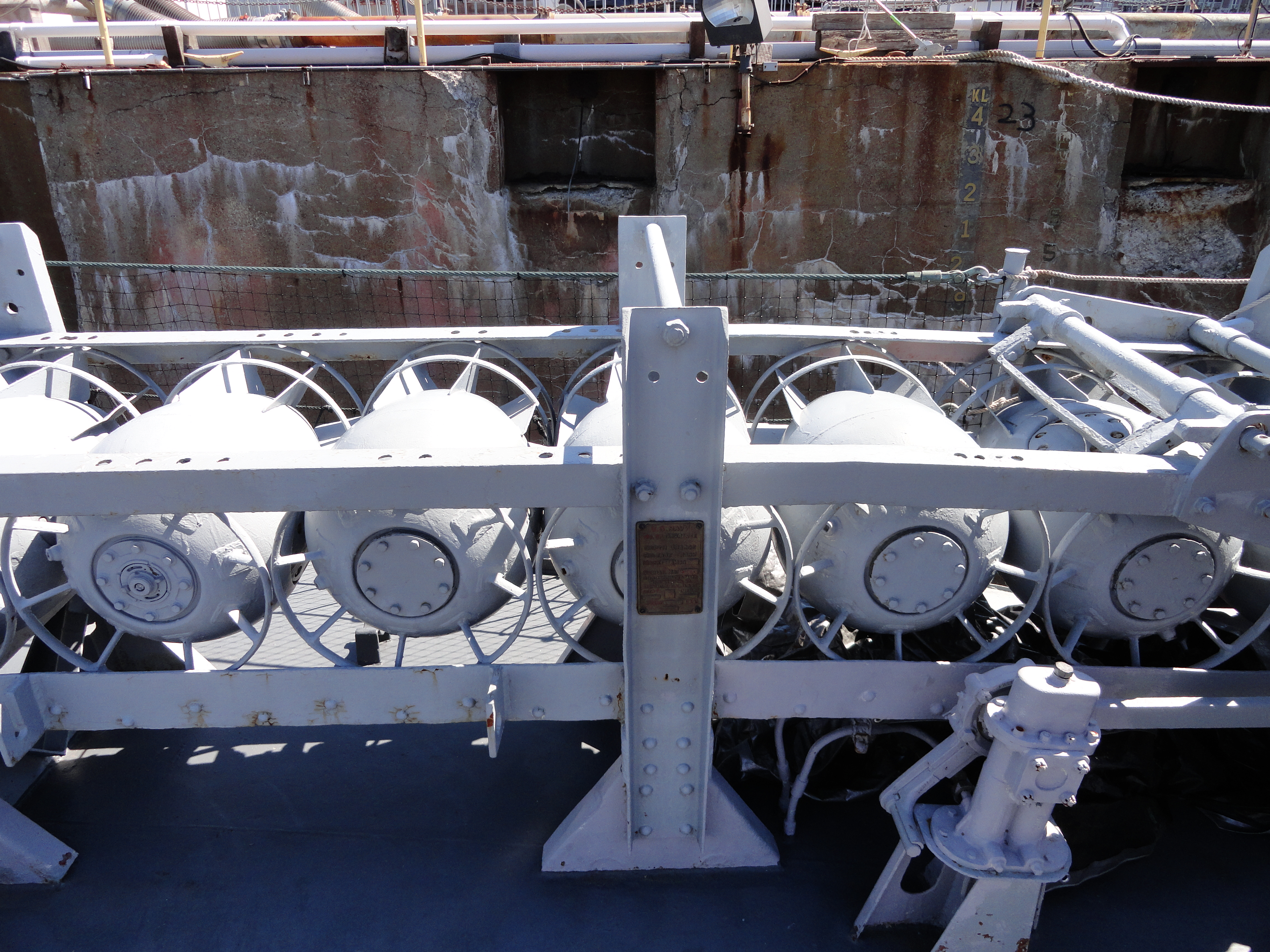
Depth charges on USS Cassin Young (DD-793)

The first attempt to fire charges against submerged targets was with aircraft bombs attached to lanyards which triggered them. A similar idea was a 16 lb (7.3 kg) guncotton charge in a lanyarded can. Two of these lashed together became known as the "depth charge Type A". Problems with the lanyards tangling and failing to function led to the development of a chemical pellet trigger as the "Type B". These were effective at a distance of around 20 ft (6 m).

A 1913 Royal Navy Torpedo School report described a device intended for countermining, a "dropping mine". At Admiral John Jellicoe's request, the standard Mark II mine was fitted with a hydrostatic pistol (developed in 1914 by Thomas Firth and Sons of Sheffield) preset for 45 ft (14 m) firing, to be launched from a stern platform. Weighing 1,150 lb (520 kg), and effective at 100 ft (30 m), the "cruiser mine" was a potential hazard to the dropping ship. The design work was carried out by Herbert Taylor at the RN Torpedo and Mine School, HMS Vernon. The first effective depth charge, the Type D, became available in January 1916. It was a barrel-like casing containing a high explosive (usually TNT, but amatol was also used when TNT became scarce). There were initially two sizes—Type D, with a 300 lb (140 kg) charge for fast ships, and Type D* with a 120 lb (54 kg) charge for ships too slow to leave the danger area before the more powerful charge detonated.

A hydrostatic pistol actuated by water pressure at a selected depth detonated the charge. Initial depth settings were 40 or 80 ft (12 or 24 m). Because production could not keep up with demand, anti-submarine vessels initially carried only two depth charges, to be released from a chute at the stern of the ship. The first success was the sinking of U-68 off County Kerry, Ireland, on 22 March 1916, by the Q-ship Farnborough. Germany became aware of the depth charge following unsuccessful attacks on U-67 on 15 April 1916, and U-69 on 20 April 1916. The only other submarines sinkings involving depth charges during 1916 were UC-19 and UB-29.

Numbers of depth charges carried per ship increased to four in June 1917, to six in August, and 30–50 by 1918. The weight of charges and racks caused ship instability unless heavy guns and torpedo tubes were removed to compensate. Improved pistols allowed greater depth settings in 50 ft (15 m) increments, from 50 to 200 ft (15 to 61 m). Even slower ships could safely use the Type D at below 100 ft (30 m) and at 10 kn (19 km/h; 12 mph) or more, so the relatively ineffective Type D* was withdrawn. Monthly use of depth charges increased from 100 to 300 per month during 1917 to an average of 1745 per month during the last six months of World War I. The Type D could be detonated as deep as 300 ft (90 m) by that date. By the war's end, 74,441 depth charges had been issued by the RN, and 16,451 fired, scoring 38 kills in all, and aiding in 140 more.

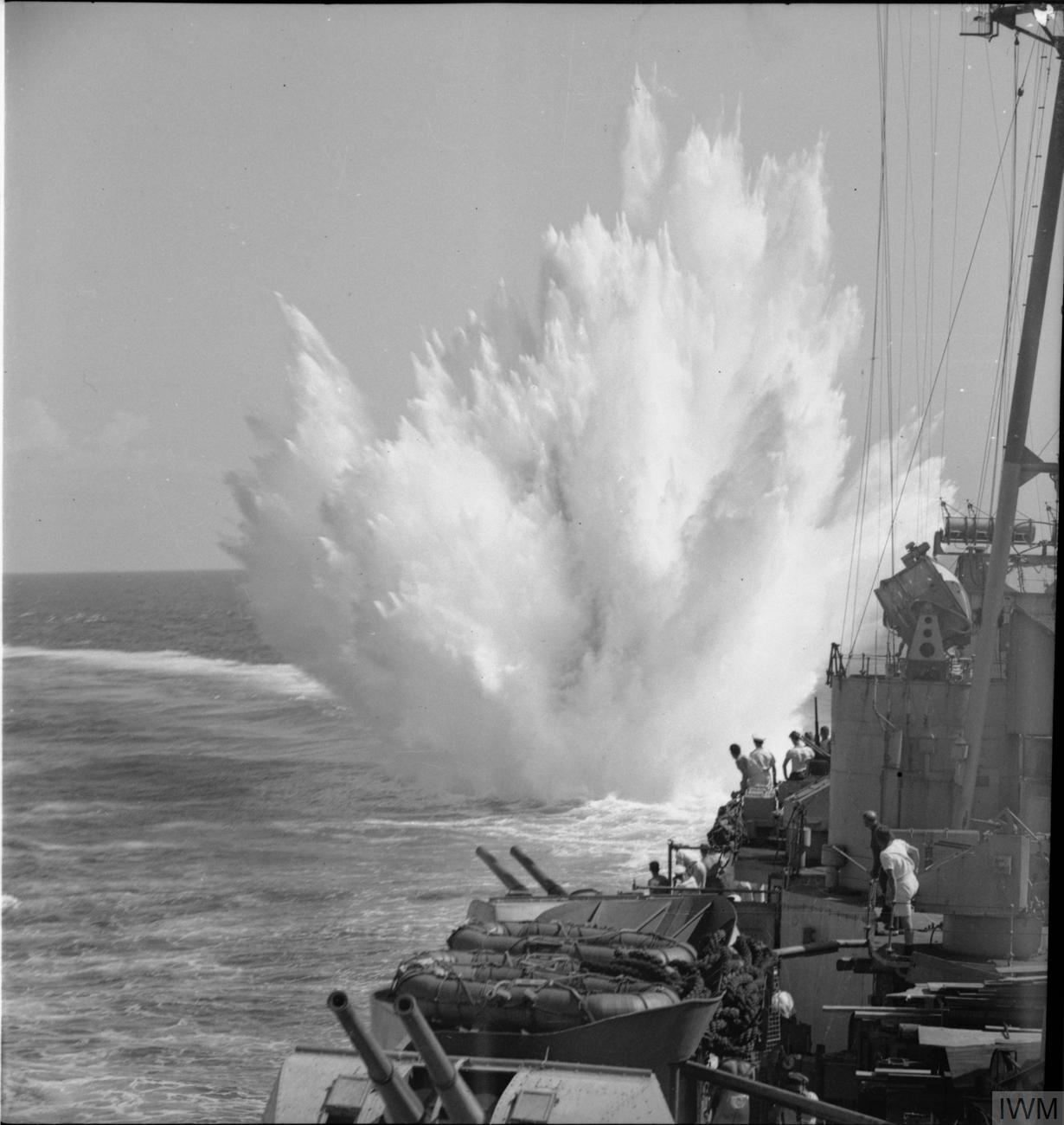
Depth charge exploding after being released by HMS Ceylon

The United States requested full working drawings of the device in March 1917. Having received them, Commander Fullinwider of the U.S. Bureau of Naval Ordnance and U.S. Navy engineer Minkler made some modifications and then patented it in the U.S. It has been argued that this was done to avoid paying the original inventor.

== Depth charges ==
=== Mark VII ===
The Royal Navy Type D depth charge was designated the "Mark VII" in 1939. Initial sinking speed was 7 ft/s (2.1 m/s) with a terminal velocity of 9.9 ft/s (3.0 m/s) at a depth of 250 ft (76 m) if rolled off the stern, or upon water contact from a depth charge thrower. Cast iron weights of 150 lb (68 kg) were attached to the Mark VII at the end of 1940 to increase sinking velocity to 16.8 ft/s (5.1 m/s). New hydrostatic pistols increased the maximum detonation depth to 900 ft (270 m). The Mark VII's 290 lb (130 kg) amatol charge was estimated to be capable of splitting a 7/8 in (22 mm) submarine pressure hull at a distance of 20 ft (6 m), and forcing the submarine to surface at twice that. The change of explosive to Torpex (or Minol) at the end of 1942 was estimated to increase those distances to 26 and 52 ft (8 and 16 m).

=== Mark X ===
The British Mark X depth charge weighed 3,000 lb (1,400 kg) and was launched from the 21 in (530 mm) torpedo tubes of older destroyers to achieve a sinking velocity of 21 ft/s (6.4 m/s). The launching ship needed to clear the area at 11 knots to avoid damage, and the charge was seldom used. Only 32 were actually fired, and they were known to be troublesome.

=== US Mk 9 ===
The teardrop-shaped United States Mark 9 depth charge entered service in the spring of 1943. The charge was 200 lb (91 kg) of Torpex with a sinking speed of 14.4 ft/s (4.4 m/s) and depth settings of up to 600 ft (180 m). Later versions increased depth to 1,000 ft (300 m) and sinking speed to 22.7 ft/s (6.9 m/s) with increased weight and improved streamlining.

Although the explosions of the standard United States 600 lb (270 kg) Mark 4 and Mark 7 depth charge used in World War II were nerve-wracking to the target, a U-boat's pressure hull would not rupture unless the charge detonated within about 15 ft (5 m). Getting the weapon within this range was a matter of luck and quite unlikely as the target took evasive action. Most U-boats sunk by depth charges were destroyed by damage accumulated from an extended barrage rather than by a single charge, and many survived hundreds of depth charges over a period of many hours, such as U-427, which survived 678 depth charges in April 1945.

== Delivery mechanisms ==
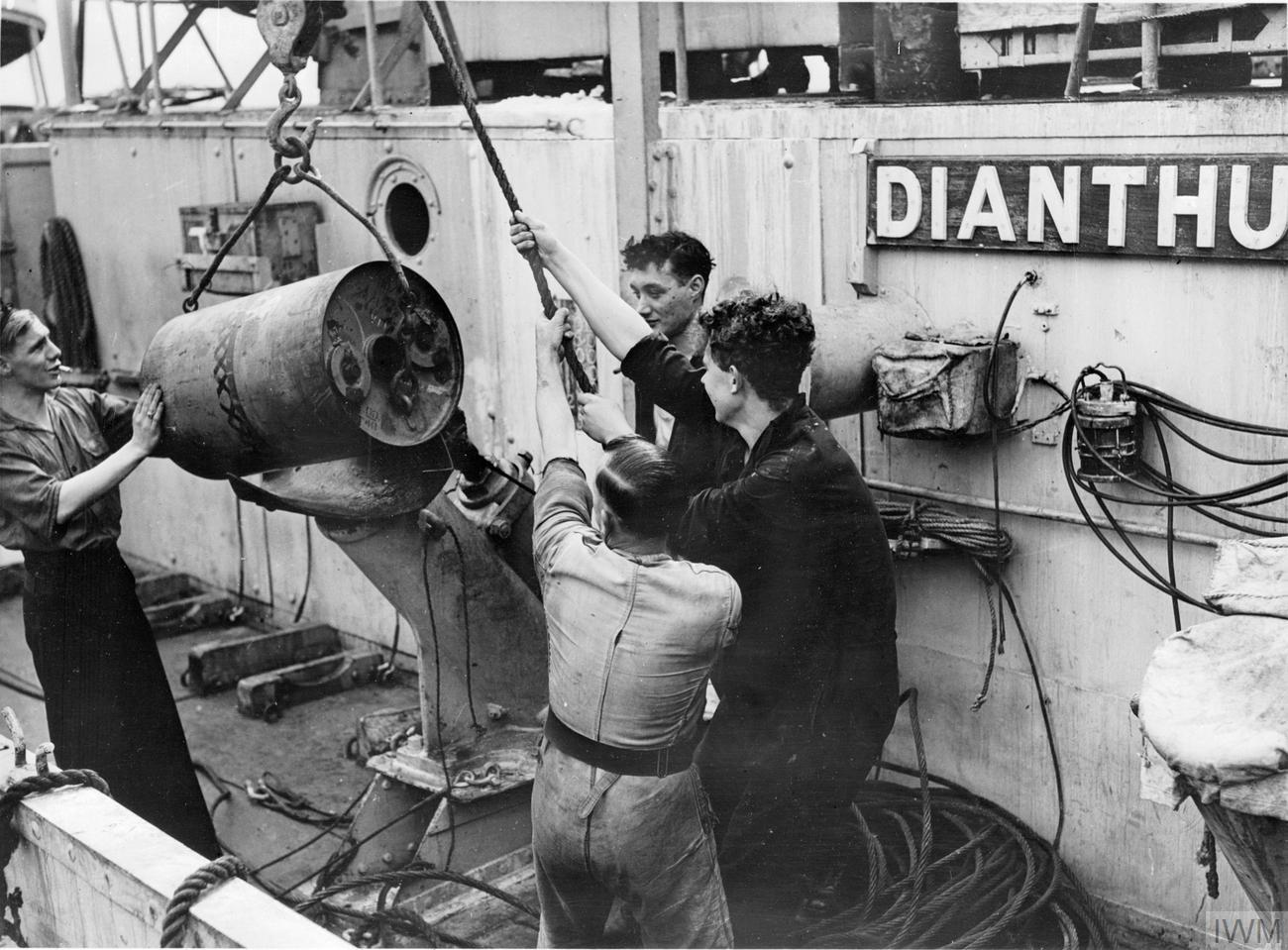
Loading a drum-type Mark VII depth charge onto a Flower-class corvette's K-gun

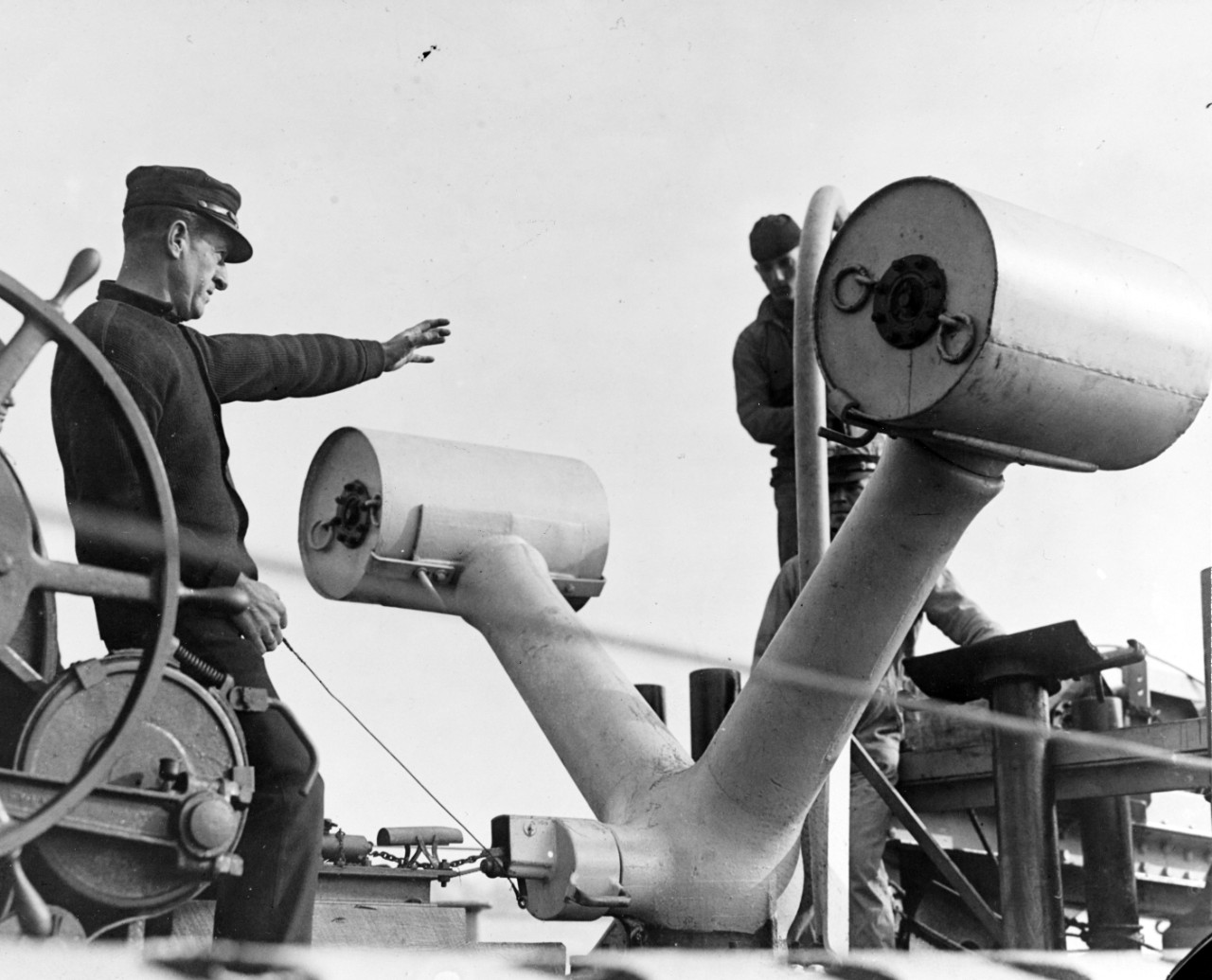
Y-gun depth charge thrower

The first delivery mechanism was to simply roll the "ashcans" off racks at the stern of the moving attacking vessel. Originally depth charges were simply placed at the top of a ramp and allowed to roll. Improved racks, which could hold several depth charges and release them remotely with a trigger, were developed towards the end of the First World War. These racks remained in use throughout World War II because they were simple and easy to reload.

Some Royal Navy trawlers used for anti-submarine work during 1917 and 1918 had a thrower on the forecastle for a single depth charge, but there do not seem to be any records of it being used in action. Specialized depth charge throwers were developed to generate a wider dispersal pattern when used in conjunction with rack-deployed charges. The first of these was developed from a British Army trench mortar. 1277 were issued, 174 installed in auxiliaries during 1917 and 1918. The bombs they launched were too light to be truly effective; only one U-boat is known to have been sunk by them.

Thornycroft created an improved version able to throw a charge 40 yd (37 m). The first was fitted in July 1917 and became operational in August. In all, 351 torpedo boat destroyers and 100 other craft were equipped. Projectors called "Y-guns" (in reference to their basic shape), developed by the U.S. Navy's Bureau of Ordnance from the Thornycroft thrower, became available in 1918. Mounted on the centerline of the ship with the arms of the Y pointing outboard, two depth charges were cradled on shuttles inserted into each arm. An explosive propellant charge was detonated in the vertical column of the Y-gun to propel a depth charge about 45 yd (41 m) over each side of the ship. The main disadvantage of the Y-gun was that it had to be mounted on the centerline of a ship's deck, which could otherwise be occupied by superstructure, masts, or guns. The first were built by New London Ship and Engine Company beginning on 24 November 1917.

The K-gun, standardized in 1942, replaced the Y-gun as the primary depth charge projector. The K-guns fired one depth charge at a time and could be mounted on the periphery of a ship's deck, thus freeing valuable centerline space. Four to eight K-guns were typically mounted per ship. The K-guns were often used together with stern racks to create patterns of six to ten charges. In all cases, the attacking ship needed to be moving fast enough to get out of the danger zone before the charges exploded.

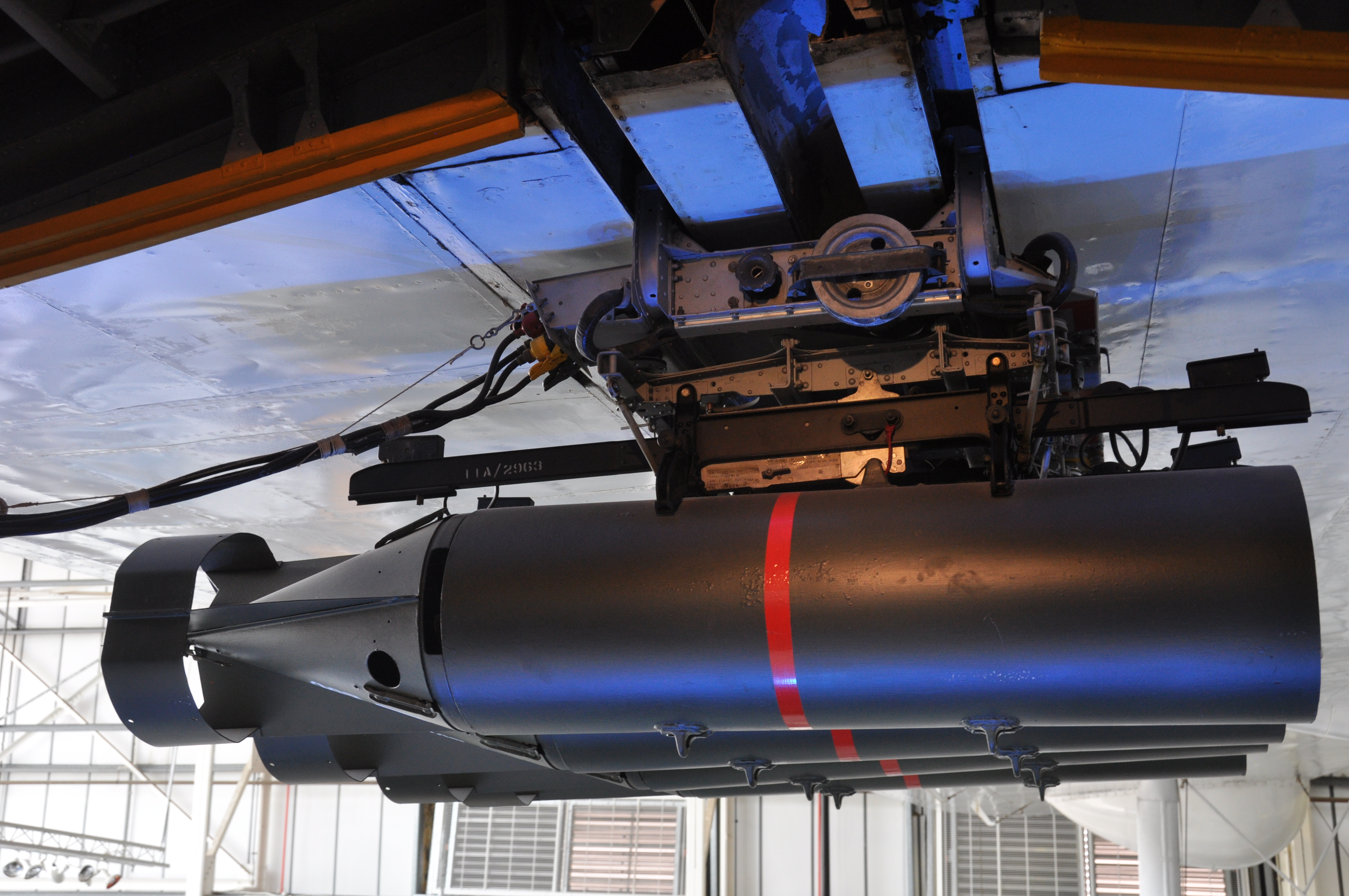
Depth bombs hung under the wings of an RAF Short Sunderland flying boat

Depth charges could also be dropped from an aircraft against submarines. At the start of World War II, Britain's primary aerial anti-submarine weapon was the 100 lb (45 kg) anti-submarine bomb, but it was too light to be effective. To replace it, the Royal Navy's 450 lb (200 kg) Mark VII depth charge was modified for aerial use by the addition of a streamlined nose fairing and stabilising fins on the tail; it entered service in 1941 as the Mark VII Airborne DC. Other designs followed in 1942.

Experiencing the same problems as the RAF with ineffective anti-submarine bombs, Captain Birger Ek of Finnish Air Force squadron LeLv 6 contacted a navy friend to use Finnish Navy depth charges from aircraft, which led to his unit's Tupolev SB bombers being modified in early 1942 to carry depth charges.

Later depth charges for dedicated aerial use were developed. These are still useful today and remain in use, particularly for shallow-water situations where a homing torpedo may not be effective. Depth charges are especially useful for "flushing the prey" in the event of a diesel submarine hiding on the bottom.

== Effectiveness ==
To be effective depth charges had to explode at the correct depth. To ensure this, a pattern of charges set to different depths would be laid atop the submarine's suspected position.

The effective use of depth charges required the combined resources and skills of many individuals during an attack. Sonar, helm, depth charge crews and the movement of other ships had to be carefully coordinated. Aircraft depth charge tactics depended on the aircraft using its speed to rapidly appear from over the horizon and surprising the submarine on the surface (where it spent most of its time) during the day or night (at night using radar to detect the target and a Leigh light to illuminate it immediately before attacking), then quickly attacking once it had been located, as the submarine would normally crash dive to escape attack.

As the Battle of the Atlantic wore on, British and Commonwealth forces became particularly adept at depth charge tactics, and formed some of the first hunter-killer groups to actively seek out and destroy German U-boats.

Surface ships usually used ASDIC (sonar) to detect submerged submarines. However, to deliver its depth charges a ship had to pass over the contact to drop them over the stern; sonar contact would be lost just before attack, rendering the hunter blind at the crucial moment. This gave a skilful submarine commander an opportunity to take evasive action. In 1942 the forward-throwing "hedgehog" mortar, which fired a spread salvo of bombs with contact fuzes at a "stand-off" distance while still in sonar contact, was introduced, and proved to be effective.

=== Pacific theater and the May Incident ===
In the Pacific Theater during World War II, Japanese depth charge attacks were initially unsuccessful because they were unaware that the latest United States Navy submarines could dive so deep. Unless caught in shallow water, an American submarine could dive below the Japanese depth charge attack. The Japanese had used attack patterns based on the older United States S-class submarines (1918–1925) that had a test depth of 200 ft (61 m); while the WWII Balao-class submarines (1943) could reach 400 ft (120 m).

This changed in June 1943 when U.S. Congressman Andrew J. May of the House Military Affairs Committee caused The May Incident. The congressman, who had just returned from the Pacific theater where he had received confidential intelligence and operational briefings from the US Navy, revealed at a press conference that there were deficiencies in Japanese depth-charge tactics. After various press associations reported the depth issue, the Japanese Imperial Navy began setting their depth charges to explode at a more effective average depth of 246 ft (75 m). Vice Admiral Charles A. Lockwood, commander of the U.S. submarine fleet in the Pacific, later estimated that May's ill-advised comments cost the US Navy as many as ten submarines and 800 seamen killed in action.

== Later developments ==
For the reasons expressed above, the depth charge was generally replaced as an anti-submarine weapon. Initially, this was by ahead-throwing weapons such as the British-developed Hedgehog and later Squid mortars. These weapons threw a pattern of warheads ahead of the attacking vessel to bracket a submerged contact. The Hedgehog was contact fuzed, while the Squid fired a pattern of three large, 440 lb (200 kg) depth charges with clockwork detonators. Later developments included the Mark 24 "Fido" acoustic homing torpedo (and later such weapons), and the SUBROC, which was armed with a nuclear depth charge. The USSR, United States and United Kingdom developed nuclear depth bombs. As of 2018, the Royal Navy retains a depth charge labelled as Mk11 Mod 3, which can be deployed from its AgustaWestland Wildcat and Merlin HM.2 helicopters.

Russia has also developed homing (but unpropelled) depth charges including the S3V Zagon and the 90SG. China has also produced such weapons.

=== Signaling ===
During the Cold War when it was necessary to inform submarines of the other side that they had been detected but without actually launching an attack, low-power "signalling depth charges" (also called "practice depth charges") were sometimes used, powerful enough to be detected when no other means of communication was possible, but not destructive.

== Underwater explosions ==
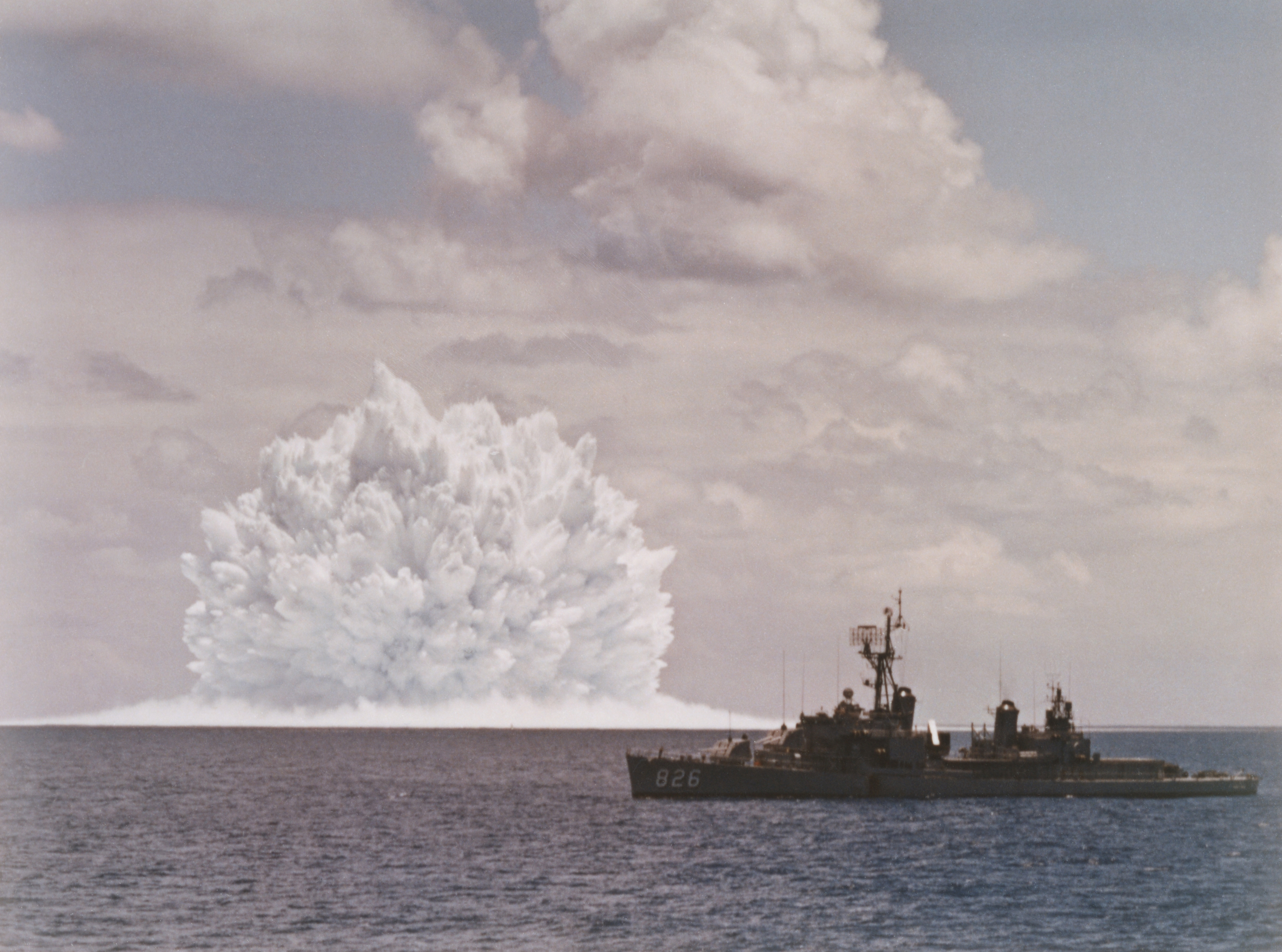
USS Agerholm (DD-826) launches an ASROC anti-submarine rocket, armed with a nuclear depth bomb, during Dominic Swordfish (1962)

The high explosive in a depth charge undergoes a rapid chemical reaction at an approximate rate of 26,000 ft/s (8,000 m/s). The gaseous products of that reaction momentarily occupy the volume previously occupied by the solid explosive, but at very high pressure. This pressure is the source of the damage and is proportional to the explosive density and the square of the detonation velocity. A depth charge gas bubble expands to equalize with the pressure of the surrounding water.

This gas expansion propagates a shock wave. The density difference of the expanding gas bubble from the surrounding water causes the bubble to rise toward the surface. Unless the explosion is shallow enough to vent the gas bubble to the atmosphere during its initial expansion, the momentum of water moving away from the gas bubble will create a gaseous void of lower pressure than the surrounding water. Surrounding water pressure then collapses the gas bubble with inward momentum causing excess pressure within the gas bubble. Re-expansion of the gas bubble then propagates another potentially damaging shock wave. Cyclical expansion and contraction can continue for several seconds until the gas bubble vents to the atmosphere.

Consequently, explosions where the depth charge is detonated at a shallow depth and the gas bubble vents into the atmosphere very soon after the detonation are quite ineffective, even though they are more dramatic and therefore preferred in movies. A sign of an effective detonation depth is that the surface just slightly rises and only after a while vents into a water burst.

Very large depth charges, including nuclear weapons, may be detonated at sufficient depth to create multiple damaging shock waves. Such depth charges can also cause damage at longer distances, if reflected shock waves from the ocean floor or surface converge to amplify radial shock waves. Submarines or surface ships may be damaged if operating in the convergence zones of their own depth charge detonations.

The damage that an underwater explosion inflicts on a submarine comes from a primary and a secondary shock wave. The primary shock wave is the initial shock wave of the depth charge, and will cause damage to personnel and equipment inside the submarine if detonated close enough. The secondary shock wave is a result of the cyclical expansion and contraction of the gas bubble and will bend the submarine back and forth and cause catastrophic hull breach, in a way that can be likened to bending a plastic ruler rapidly back and forth until it snaps. Up to sixteen cycles of secondary shock waves have been recorded in tests. The effect of the secondary shock wave can be reinforced if another depth charge detonates on the other side of the hull in close time proximity to the first detonation, which is why depth charges are normally launched in pairs with different pre-set detonation depths.

The killing radius of a depth charge depends on the depth of detonation, the payload of the depth charge and the size and strength of the submarine hull. A depth charge of approximately 220 lb (100 kg) of TNT (400 MJ) would normally have a killing radius (resulting in a hull breach) of only 10–13 ft (3–4 m) against a conventional 1000-ton submarine, while the disablement radius (where the submarine is not sunk but is put out of commission) would be approximately 26–33 ft (8–10 m). A larger payload increases the radius only slightly because the effect of an underwater explosion decreases as the cube of the distance to the target.

== See also ==
- Bouncing bomb, the specialized air-delivered depth charge–like bomb used for the RAF's Operation Chastise
- Naval mine
- Shock factor
