= Agerholm =

Agerholm may also refer to:

== People ==
- Harold C. Agerholm (1925–1944), American marine
- Pernille Agerholm (born 1991), Danish table tennis player

== Other uses ==
- USS Agerholm, American ship
