= Operation Swordfish =

1962 nuclear weapon test

Operation Swordfish or Operation Dominic Swordfish/Dominic-Swordfish was the May 11, 1962 operational test of the nuclear ASROC anti-submarine weapon system, as part of the larger Operation Dominic, a series of 31 nuclear tests. The ASROC uses a short range rocket booster to deliver a Mk 34 armed depth charge to the surface over the submarine target. The device sinks to a depth of approximately 650 feet or 235 meters where it would detonate with a yield around 10 kt of force.

The RUR-5 ASROC was fired by the USS Agerholm (DD-826) about 370 nautical miles (690 km) west-southwest of San Diego.
