= S3V Zagon =

The S3V Zagon is a guided but un-propelled depth charge developed by the Russian firm Tactical Missiles Corporation. It was first unveiled at the 1992 MAKS Airshow as part of a marketing effort which resulted in China purchasing the weapon.

On 13 February 2017, the Zagon-2 version entered production for the Russian Ministry of Defence. China unveiled a similar unnamed weapon in 2020.

== Description ==
The S3V is an aerially deployed weapon, with a parachute system detached at the moment of splashdown. The sonar mounted in the nose is activated upon entering the water, searching for hostile submarines. It directs its control surfaces to maneuver the depth charge toward the target once it is located and identified. The developer has claimed that the S3V is around 1.2 to 1.6 times more effective than conventional unguided depth charges in shallow water (≤ 200 meters) and around 4 to 8 times more effective in deep water (up to 600 meters). The weapon is usually deployed by Tu-142, Il-38 and Ka-27 aircraft.

== Specifications ==
Value	Zagon	Zagon-2
Length (m)	1.3	1.5
Diameter (mm)	211	232
Weight (kg)	94	120
Warhead	19 kg	35 kg, shaped
Depth, minimum (m)	150	?
Depth, maximum (m)	> 600	> 600
Rate of descent (m/s)	16.2	?
Angle of attack/descent	60–90°	?
Worst conditions allowed for aerial deployment	sea state 6	?
Homing radius (m)	120	450
Deployment platform	Fixed and rotary-wing aircraft	

== Operators ==
People's Republic of China
People's Liberation Army Navy
Russia
Russian Navy
