= Mark VII depth charge =

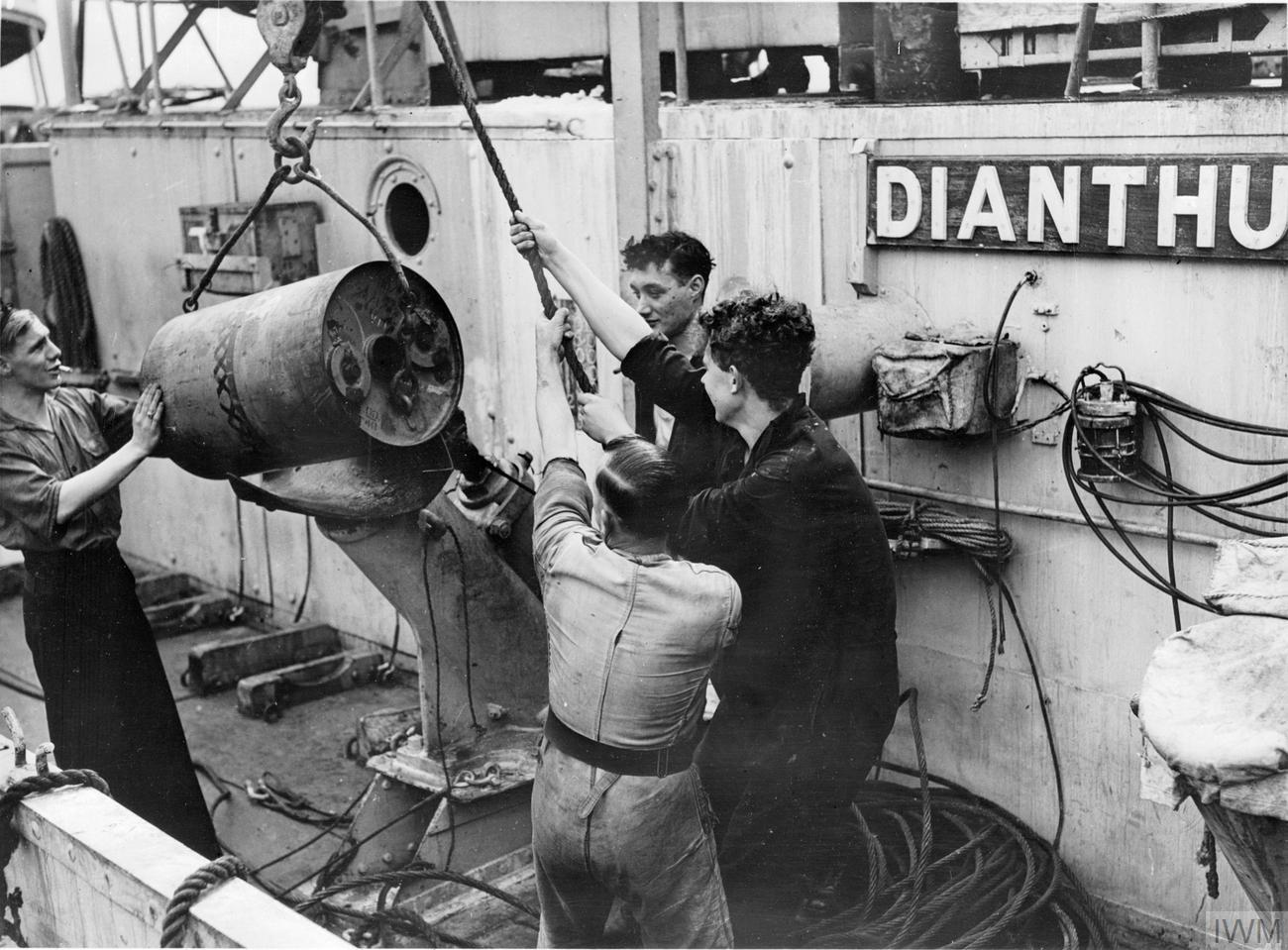
- A Mk VII depth charge being loaded onto a Mk IV depth charge thrower onboard the Flower-class corvette HMS Dianthus.
- Type: Depth charge
- Place of origin: UK

Service history
- In service: Mark VII depth charge:1939-unknown
- Wars: World War II

Production history
- Variants: Mark VII heavy and Mark VII Airborne depth charge

Specifications
- Mass: 420 lb (190 kg)
- Filling weight: 290 lb (130 kg) TNT

The Mark VII depth charge was the standard British depth charge for the first three years of World War II

== Development ==
The Mark VII depth charge most likely has its roots in British depth charges developed and used during World War I.

== Service ==
The Mark VII depth charge was the primary British anti-submarine weapon until 1944 when the anti-submarine projectile launchers the Hedgehog spigot mortar and Squid three-barrelled mortar introduced in 1943 and 1944 proved more effective. In 1939 this was the only anti-submarine weapon available to British surface ships.

== Variants ==
Mark VII heavy
Introduced in 1940. A 150 lb (68 kg) cast iron weight was attached to increase sinking rate.

Mark VII Airborne depth charge
Introduced in 1941, this was the Mark VII depth charge adapted for use from aircraft. Had nose and tail fairings that broke off when it hit the water.
