= USS Guitarro (SSN-665) =

Submarine of the United States

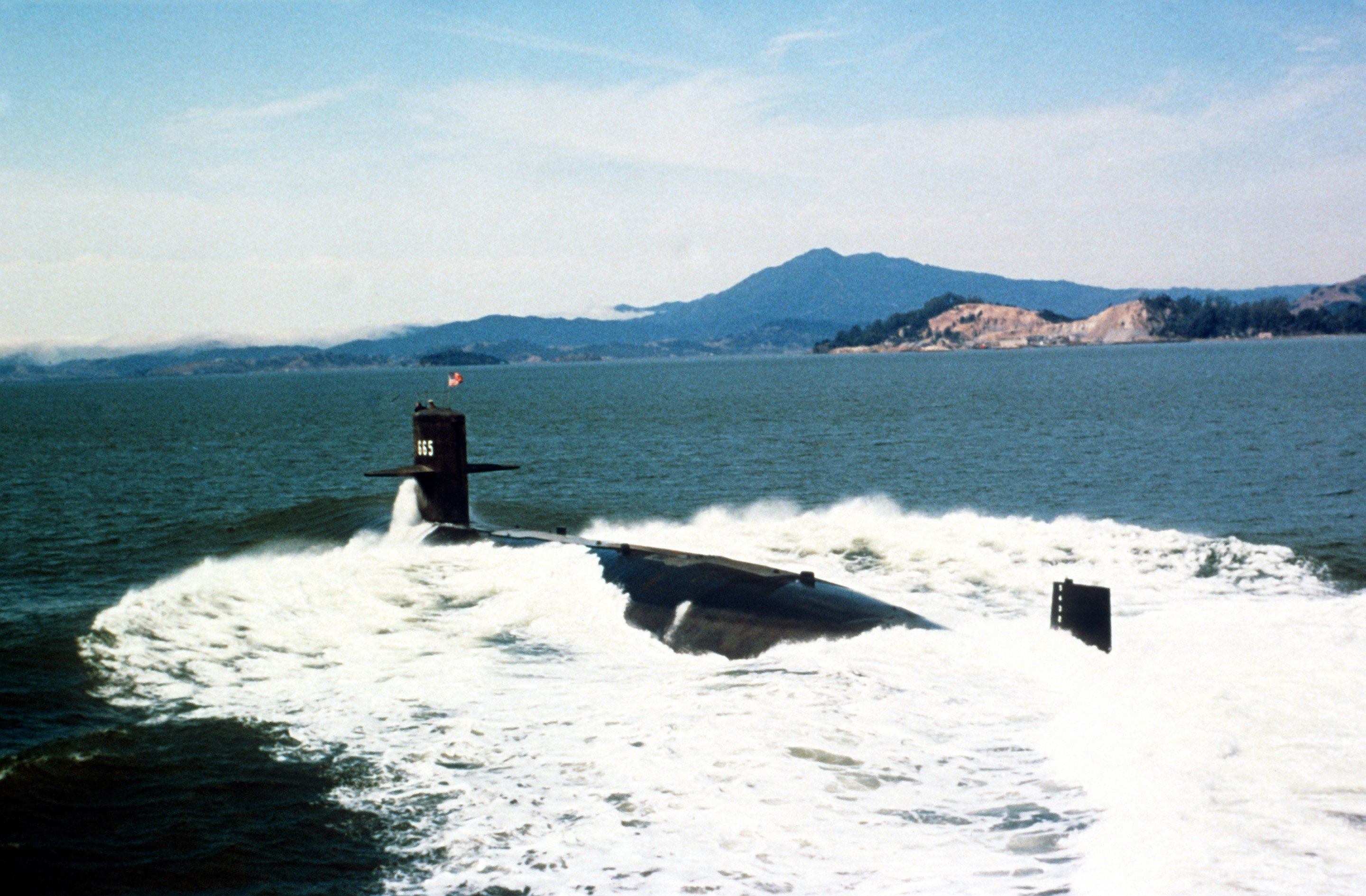
- USS Guitarro (SSN-665) off San Francisco, California

History

United States
- Name: USS Guitarro
- Namesake: The guitarro, a ray of the guitarfish family
- Ordered: 18 December 1964
- Builder: Mare Island Naval Shipyard, Vallejo, California
- Laid down: 9 December 1965
- Launched: 27 July 1968
- Sponsored by: Mrs. John M. Taylor
- Commissioned: 9 September 1972
- Decommissioned: 29 May 1992
- Stricken: 29 May 1992
- Nickname(s): "Mare Island Mud Puppy"
- Fate: Scrapping via Ship and Submarine Recycling Program completed 18 October 1994

General characteristics
- Class & type: Sturgeon-class submarine
- Displacement: 3,860 long tons (3,922 t) light; 4,268 long tons (4,336 t) full; 408 long tons (415 t) dead
- Length: 292 ft 3 in (89.08 m)
- Beam: 31 ft 8 in (9.65 m)
- Draft: 28 ft 8 in (8.74 m)
- Installed power: 15,000 shaft horsepower (11.2 megawatts)
- Propulsion: One S5W nuclear reactor, two steam turbines, one screw
- Speed: 15 knots (28 km/h; 17 mph) surfaced; 25 knots (46 km/h; 29 mph) submerged
- Test depth: 1,300 feet (400 meters)
- Complement: 108
- Armament: 4 × 21-inch (533 mm) torpedo tubes

USS Guitarro (SSN-665), a Sturgeon-class submarine, was the second ship of the United States Navy to be named for the guitarro.

== Construction and commissioning ==
=== Keel-laying and launching ===
The contract to build Guitarro was awarded to Mare Island Naval Shipyard at Vallejo, California, on 18 December 1964 and her keel was laid there on 9 December 1965. She was launched on 27 July 1968, sponsored by Mrs. John M. Taylor, wife of the Vice Admiral.

On 15 March 1969 during a meeting with the shipyard managers, Cmdr. William G. Lange urged them to create centralized control and designate responsibility for all construction. The shipyard representatives dismissed his idea, saying "the shipyard had been building ships for a long time without the need for such a procedure and no one had been killed or equipments damaged yet."

=== Sinking ===
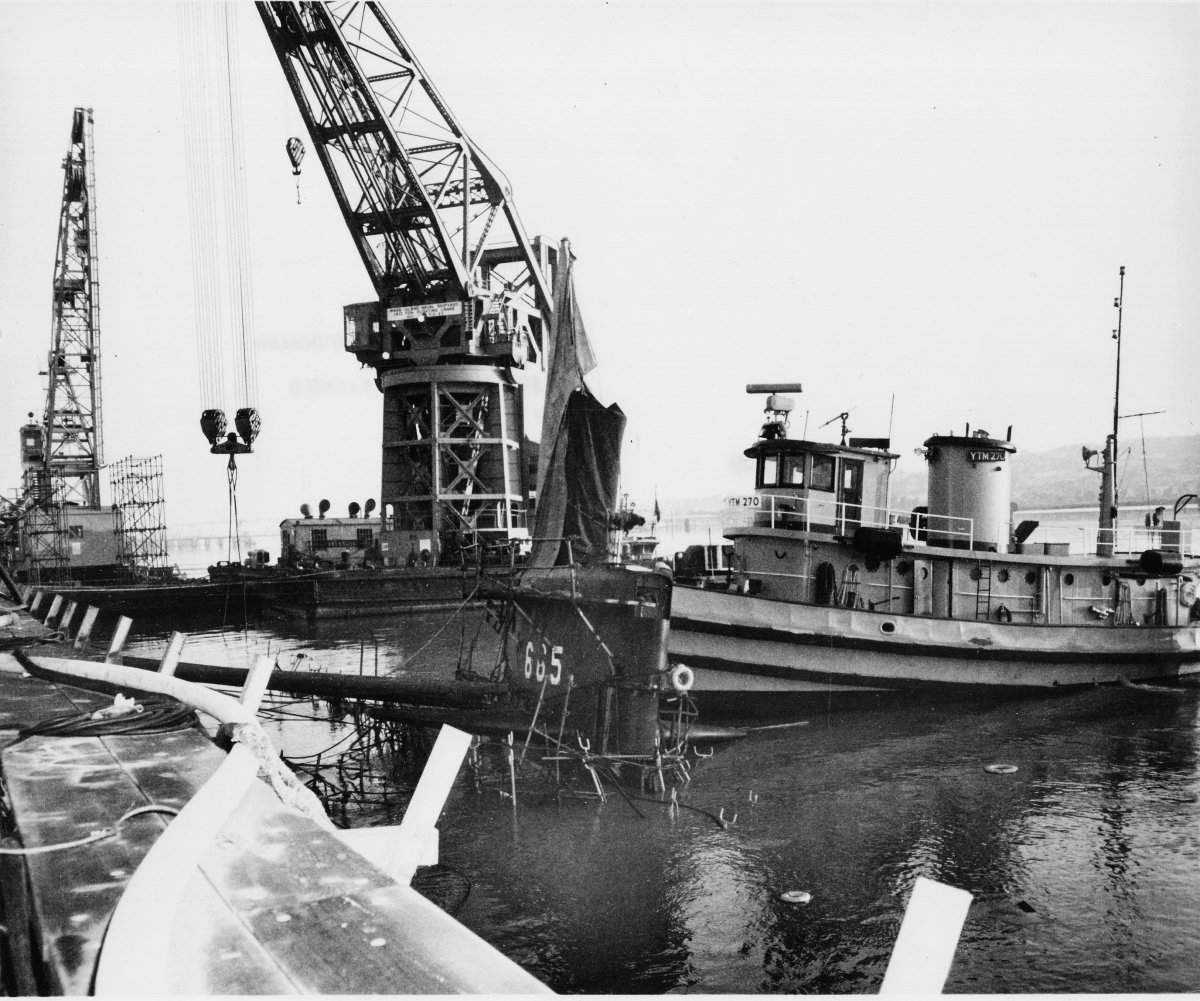
Guitarro on the bottom of the Napa River after her accidental sinking at Mare Island Naval Shipyard at Vallejo, California, on 15 May 1969.

On 15 May 1969, Guitarro was moored in the Napa River at Mare Island Naval Shipyard while construction was still underway. At about 16:00, a civilian nuclear construction group began to calibrate the aft ballast tanks, which required them to fill the tanks with approximately 5 short tons (4.5 t) of water. Within 30 minutes, a different, non-nuclear civilian construction group began an assignment to bring Guitarro within a half-degree of trim; this entailed adding water to the forward ballast tanks to overcome a reported two-degree bow-up attitude. Until shortly before 20:00, both groups continued to add water, unaware of each other's activities.

Twice between 16:30 and 20:00, a security watch advised the non-nuclear group that Guitarro was riding so low forward that the 1.5 ft (0.46 m)-high wakes of boats operating in the Napa River were sloshing into the sonar dome manhole, but the group ignored the warnings. At 19:45, the non-nuclear group stopped adding water to the ballast tanks and began to halt work for their meal break, leaving at 20:00. At 19:50, the nuclear group completed their calibrations and began to empty the tanks aft.

At 20:30, both the nuclear group, still aboard, and the non-nuclear group, returning from their break, noticed Guitarro taking a sudden down angle which put the forward hatches underwater. Massive flooding took place through several large open hatches. Efforts between 20:30 and 20:45 to close watertight doors and hatches were largely unsuccessful because lines and cables ran through the doors and hatches, preventing them from closing. At 20:55, Guitarro sank, leaving only her sail above water, earning her the nickname "Mare Island Mud Puppy".

=== Causes ===
In an attempt to correct what they thought was an out of trim condition, the non-nuclear construction team in the forward part of the boat purposefully defeated safety measures preventing accidentally filling ballast tanks while the sub was under construction. During construction, steel plates are welded over the ballast tanks flood ports to prevent water from getting into the tanks and putting the submarine in an unsafe condition. The construction crew put a fire hose down the tank's vent pipe and forced it past the check valve.

The Congressional report concluded that the sinking was caused in large part by "the action, or inaction, of certain construction workers who either failed to recognize an actual or potential threat to the ship's safety or assumed that it was not their responsibility." The report stated that the "lack of centralized control and responsibility for all construction" was the overriding cause.

One of the factors contributing to the ship's sinking was the open manhole used to access the bow structure sonar dome containing the boat's sonar sphere. The manhole has a bolted cover which had been removed for maintenance purposes. The opening was protected by a cofferdam approximately 3 feet (0.91 m) high. The cofferdam was intended to prevent water from accidentally entering the dome and contacting the exposed electronic gear.

To facilitate repair work, the cofferdam and the bolted manhole cover were removed in early March 1969 and neither the cofferdam nor the cover was ever replaced. When the construction crews added and then removed water from the ballast tanks, affecting the boat's trim, the manhole was exposed to waves caused by the wake of other vessels, causing the boat to sink at the bow, eventually filling the entire submarine.

=== Refloating ===
Guitarro was refloated three days later, on 18 May 1969. Damages to her were estimated at $15.2 to $21.85 million (equivalent to $99 to $143 million in 2024).

=== Lessons learned ===
Among other recommendations affecting communication, management, and supervision of ship construction, the report authors recommended that cables and lines running through watertight hatches and doors be equipped with quick disconnect fittings.

=== Commissioning ===
Guitarro had been scheduled to be commissioned in January 1970, but repairs necessitated by her sinking dictated a 32-month delay. She finally was commissioned on 9 September 1972.

== Service history ==
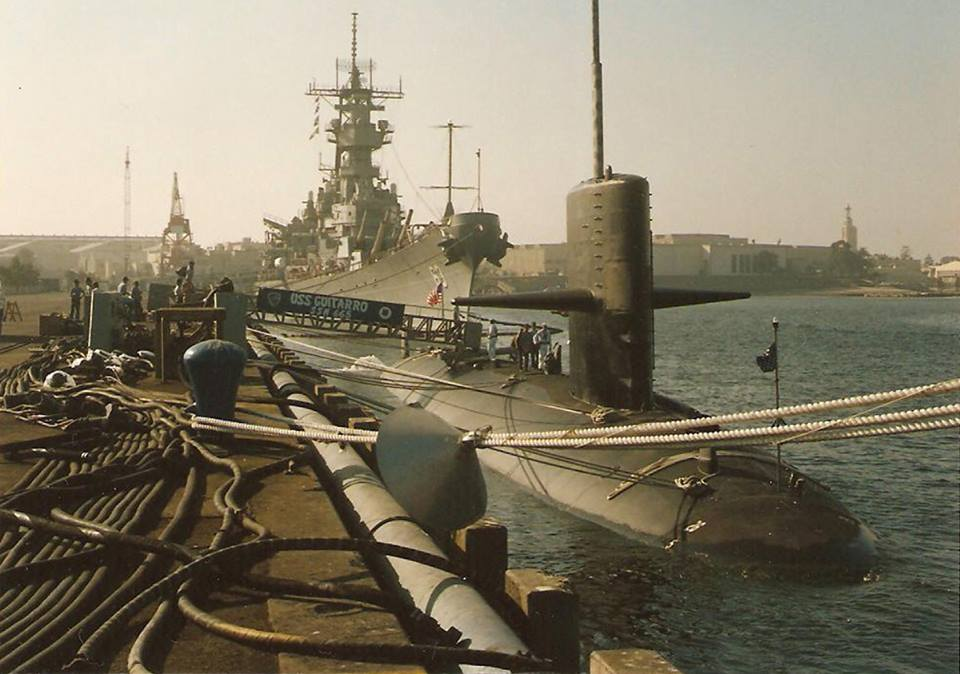
USS Guitarro (SSN-665) hosting the first tour of a US nuclear submarine by high-ranking Russian officials

In the mid-to-late 1970s, Guitarro was stationed at Point Loma in San Diego, California, commanded by Alvin H. Pauole, followed by Scott Van Hoften.

Guitarro played a major role in developing tactics for prototype combat systems deployed to the Pacific submarine fleet, in particular the new Submarine Towed Array Sensor System (STASS) along with its BQR-20 series digital sonar displays. In the mid-1970s, Guitarro also installed the first digital submarine combat system (BQQ-5 sonar and Mk-117 fire control system) and participated in the development of submarine-launched Harpoon and Tomahawk cruise missiles.

She was active at the time in the pre-operational testing of the new Tomahawk cruise missile, launching several of the missiles on a test range off the coast of Southern California.

== Decommissioning and disposal ==
Guitarro was decommissioned on 29 May 1992 and stricken from the Naval Vessel Register the same day. Her scrapping via the Nuclear-Powered Ship and Submarine Recycling Program at Puget Sound Naval Shipyard in Bremerton, Washington, was completed on 18 October 1994.
