= Harold C. Agerholm =

World War II Marine Corps Medal of Honor recipient (1925–1944)

Harold Agerholm
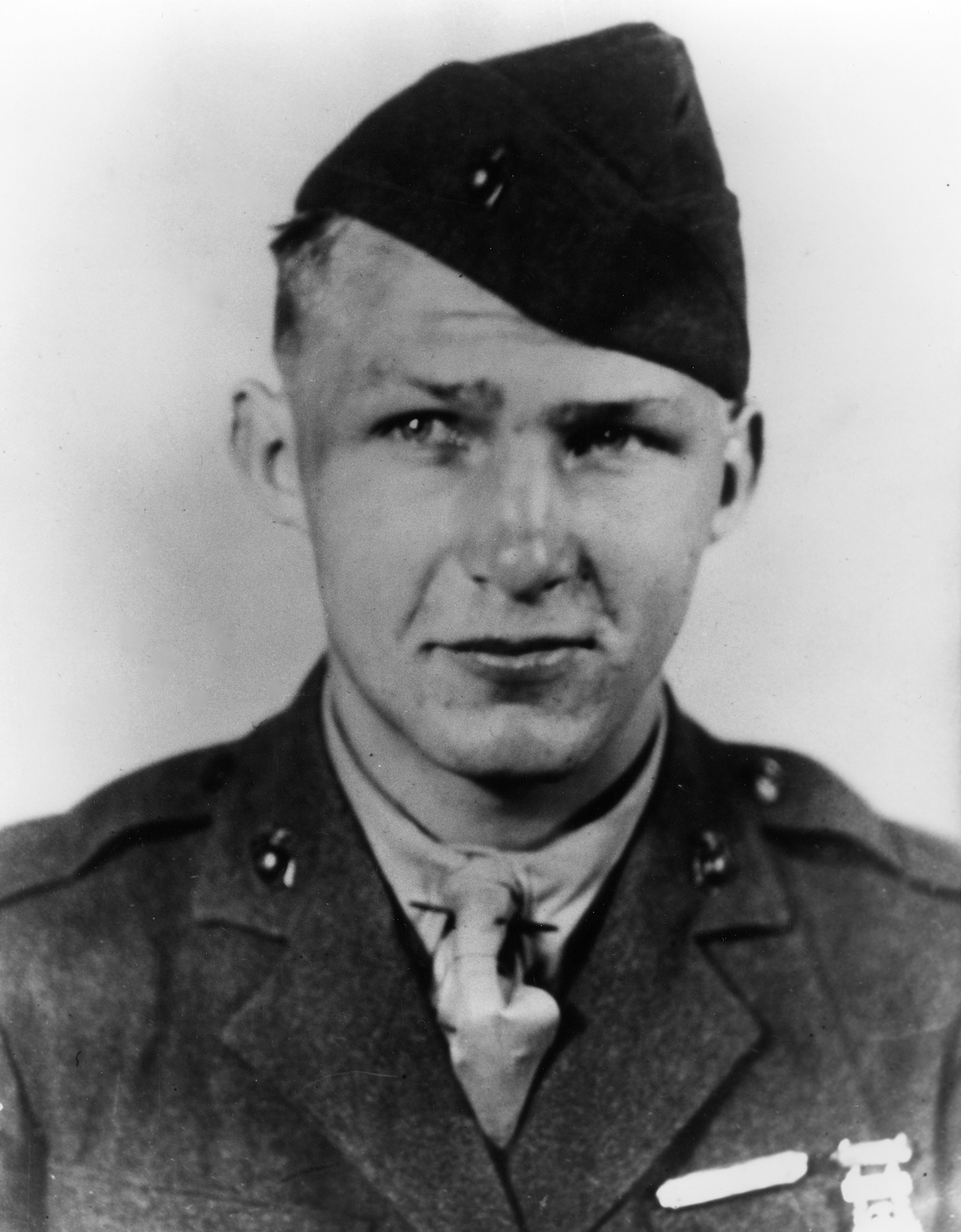
- Born: January 29, 1925; Racine, Wisconsin, US
- Died: July 7, 1944 (aged 19); Saipan, Marianas Islands
- Military career
- Allegiance: United States
- Branch: United States Marine Corps
- Service years: 1942–1944
- Rank: Private First Class
- Units: 4th Battalion, 10th Marines
- Conflicts: World War II: Battle of Tarawa; Battle of Saipan †
- Awards: Medal of Honor; Purple Heart

Private First Class Harold Christ Agerholm, USMCR (January 29, 1925 – July 7, 1944) served as a Marine during World War II. He received the Medal of Honor posthumously for his actions while engaged with Japanese forces during the Battle of Saipan in the Marianas Islands.

== Biography ==
Agerholm was born January 29, 1925, in Racine, Wisconsin and attended schools in the Racine Unified School District. After working for five months as a multigraph operator for the Rench Manufacturing Company (now Racine Industries, Inc), he joined the Marine Corps Reserve on July 16, 1942.

Agerholm received his recruit training at Marine Corps Recruit Depot San Diego, California. Upon completion of his training, Agerholm was assigned to Headquarters and Service Battery, 4th Battalion, 10th Marines, 2nd Marine Division. He embarked for overseas duty on November 3, 1942, to New Zealand, where he trained with his battalion in Wellington for 11 months.

In January 1943, Agerholm was promoted to private first class and appointed the battery storeroom keeper. He took part in the fighting on Betio Island, Tarawa Atoll, in November 1943. After the end of hostilities on Tarawa, Agerholm went with the 2nd Marine Division to the Hawaiian Islands, where they trained for the forthcoming invasion of Saipan.

Agerholm landed on Saipan on June 15, 1944, nine days after the D-Day invasion in Europe. With the battle for the island raging for three weeks, the enemy launched a vigorous counter-attack on July 7, and a neighboring battalion was overrun. Agerholm volunteered to help evacuate casualties. For nearly three hours, he single-handedly evacuated 45 casualties while under intense rifle and mortar fire before being mortally wounded by a Japanese sniper.

For his actions on Saipan, Agerholm was posthumously awarded the Medal of Honor. He also received the Purple Heart Medal (posthumously), the Presidential Unit Citation, the Asiatic-Pacific Campaign Medal with two bronze stars and the World War II Victory Medal.

Agerholm's mother was privately presented his Medal of Honor on June 25, 1945, by the Commandant of the Ninth Naval District, honoring her request that she "didn't want any public presentation."

== Awards and honors ==
=== Decorations ===

Medal of Honor
| Purple Heart | Combat Action Ribbon | Navy Presidential Unit Citation |
| American Campaign Medal | Asiatic-Pacific Campaign Medal w/ 2 service stars | World War II Victory Medal |

=== Medal of Honor citation ===
His Medal of Honor citation reads as follows:

Citation:

For conspicuous gallantry and intrepidity at the risk of his life above and beyond the call of duty while serving with the 4th Battalion, 10th Marines, 2nd Marine Division, in action against enemy Japanese forces on Saipan, Marianas Islands, July 7, 1944. When the enemy launched a fierce, determined counterattack against our positions and overran a neighboring artillery battalion, PFC Agerholm immediately volunteered to assist in the efforts to check the hostile attack and evacuate our wounded. Locating and appropriating an abandoned ambulance jeep, he repeatedly made extremely perilous trips under heavy rifle and mortar fire and single-handedly loaded and evacuated approximately forty-five casualties, working tirelessly and with utter disregard for his own safety during a grueling period of more than three hours. Despite intense, persistent enemy fire, he ran out to aid two men whom he believed to be wounded Marines but was himself mortally wounded by a Japanese sniper while carrying out his hazardous mission. PFC Agerholm's brilliant initiative, great personal valor and self-sacrificing efforts in the face of almost certain death reflect the highest credit upon himself and the U.S. Naval Service. He gallantly gave his life for his country.

=== Posthumous honors ===
On June 19, 1946, in Boston, Massachusetts, the destroyer USS Agerholm was commissioned and named in honor of PFC Agerholm. The Agerholm was decommissioned in 1978.

A combined middle school and elementary school in Racine is named for Agerholm and Medal of Honor recipient Major John L. Jerstad (Jerstad-Agerholm Elementary/Middle School). During the period when it administered the Northern Mariana Islands, the US Navy built a school on Navy Hill, Saipan, for its dependents and named it the HC Agerholm School.

The Harold C. Agerholm Memorial Gun Park near the headquarters of the 10th Marine Regiment in Camp Lejeune, North Carolina is named in his honor.

== See also ==
- List of Medal of Honor recipients for World War II
