= Operation Dominic =

1962 US nuclear test series

- Dominic-Bighorn, 7.7 megatons.

Information
- Country: United States
- Test site: Johnston Island, Johnston Atoll; Kiritimati (Christmas Island), Kiribati; Pacific Ocean off California
- Period: 1962
- Number of tests: 31
- Test type: air drop, free air drop, high-altitude rocket (30–80 km), parachuted, underwater
- Max. yield: 9.96 megatonnes of TNT (41.7 PJ)

Test series chronology

Operation Dominic was a series of 31 nuclear test explosions ("shots") with a 38.1 Mt (159 PJ) total yield conducted in 1962 by the United States in the Pacific. This test series was scheduled quickly, in order to respond in kind to the Soviet resumption of testing after the tacit 1958–1961 test moratorium. Most of these shots were conducted with free fall bombs dropped from B-52 bomber aircraft. Twenty of these shots were to test new weapons designs; six to test weapons effects; and several shots to confirm the reliability of existing weapons. The Thor missile was also used to lift warheads into near-space to conduct high-altitude tests; these shots were collectively called Operation Fishbowl.

Operation Dominic occurred during a period of high Cold War tension between the United States and the Soviet Union, since the Cuban Bay of Pigs Invasion had occurred not long before. Nikita Khrushchev announced the end of a three-year moratorium on nuclear testing on 30 August 1961, and Soviet tests recommenced on 1 September, initiating a series of tests that included the detonation of the Tsar Bomba. President John F. Kennedy responded by authorizing Operation Dominic. It was the last atmospheric test series conducted by the U.S., as the Limited Test Ban Treaty was signed in Moscow the following year.

The operation was undertaken by Joint Task Force 8.

The U.S. Atomic Energy Commission (AEC) performed Operation Dominic II, an atmospheric nuclear test series, at the Nevada Test Site (NTS) from July 7 to 17, 1962. The test series included four low-yield shots, three of which were near-surface detonations and one a tower shot. Exercise IVY FLATS included one of the near-surface shots, fired from a Davy Crockett rocket launcher.

== Shots ==
=== Sunset ===
The shot report lists the yield as 855 kilotonnes of TNT (3,580 TJ) ±20% measured from a bhangmeter and 930 kilotonnes of TNT (3,900 TJ) ±10% from fireball analysis. Other sources give the yield as 1 megatonne of TNT (4.2 PJ).

== Full list of shots ==
United States' Dominic series tests and detonations
Name (Note: The US, France and the UK have code-named their test events, while the USSR and China did not, and therefore have only test numbers (with some exceptions – Soviet peaceful explosions were named). Word translations into English in parentheses unless the name is a proper noun. A dash followed by a number indicates a member of a salvo event. The US also sometimes named the individual explosions in such a salvo test, which results in "name1 – 1(with name2)". If test is canceled or aborted, then the row data like date and location discloses the intended plans, where known.)	Date time (UT)	Local time zone (Note: To convert the UT time into standard local, add the number of hours in parentheses to the UT time; for local daylight saving time, add one additional hour. If the result is earlier than 00:00, add 24 hours and subtract 1 from the day; if it is 24:00 or later, subtract 24 hours and add 1 to the day. Historical time zone data obtained from the IANA time zone database.)	Location (Note: Rough place name and a latitude/longitude reference; for rocket-carried tests, the launch location is specified before the detonation location, if known. Some locations are extremely accurate; others (like airdrops and space blasts) may be quite inaccurate. "~" indicates a likely pro-forma rough location, shared with other tests in that same area.)	Elevation + height (Note: Elevation is the ground level at the point directly below the explosion relative to sea level; height is the additional distance added or subtracted by tower, balloon, shaft, tunnel, air drop or other contrivance. For rocket bursts the ground level is "N/A". In some cases it is not clear if the height is absolute or relative to ground, for example, Plumbbob/John. No number or units indicates the value is unknown, while "0" means zero. Sorting on this column is by elevation and height added together.)	Delivery (Note: Atmospheric, airdrop, balloon, gun, cruise missile, rocket, surface, tower, and barge are all disallowed by the Partial Nuclear Test Ban Treaty. Sealed shaft and tunnel are underground, and remained useful under the PTBT. Intentional cratering tests are borderline; they occurred under the treaty, were sometimes protested, and generally overlooked if the test was declared to be a peaceful use.) Purpose (Note: Include weapons development, weapon effects, safety test, transport safety test, war, science, joint verification and industrial/peaceful, which may be further broken down.)	Device (Note: Designations for test items where known, "?" indicates some uncertainty about the preceding value, nicknames for particular devices in quotes. This category of information is often not officially disclosed.)	Yield (Note: Estimated energy yield in tons, kilotons, and megatons. A ton of TNT equivalent is defined as 4.184 gigajoules (1 gigacalorie).)	Fallout (Note: Radioactive emission to the atmosphere aside from prompt neutrons, where known. The measured species is only iodine-131 if mentioned, otherwise it is all species. No entry means unknown, probably none if underground and "all" if not; otherwise notation for whether measured on the site only or off the site, where known, and the measured amount of radioactivity released.)	References	Notes
Adobe	April 25, 1962 15:46:??	LINT (10.67 hrs) (−10 hrs, 40 min)	Kiritimati (Christmas Island), Kiribati 1.59°N 157.32°W	0 + 884 m (2,900 ft)	free air drop, weapons development	XW-50X1-Y2	190 kt			Verification test, similar to Aztec, Kingfish, Bluegill Triple Prime. Used in a Mk-39 Mod-1 Type 3 drop case.
Aztec	April 27, 1962 16:02:??	LINT (−10.67 hrs) (−10 hrs, 40 min)	Kiritimati (Christmas Island), Kiribati 1.62°N 157.31°W	0 + 796 m (2,612 ft)	air drop, weapons development	XW-50X1-Y3	410 kt			similar to Adobe, Kingfish, Bluegill Triple Prime, yield slightly lower than expected; achieved 2.21 kt/kg.
Arkansas	May 2, 1962 18:02:??	LINT (−10.67 hrs) (−10 hrs, 40 min)	Kiritimati (Christmas Island), Kiribati 1.58°N 157.26°W	0 + 1,533 m (5,030 ft)	parachuted, weapons development	XW-56-X2 with Starling primary and Fife secondary.	1.1 Mt			Highly successful; parachute retarded, only 600 ft (180 m) from aimpoint. 4.00 kt/kg.
Questa	May 4, 1962 19:05:??	LINT (−10.67 hrs) (−10 hrs, 40 min)	Kiritimati (Christmas Island), Kiribati 1.63°N 157.32°W	0 + 1,594 m (5,230 ft)	air drop, weapons development	XW-59 with Tsetse primary	670 kt			Similar to Alma, Rinconada, Sunset, yield considerably lower than expected.
Frigate Bird	May 6, 1962 23:30:??	jamt (−11 hrs); Believed in use during Dominic, Fishbowl, HT I.	Launched from 12.448°N 134.854°W, elv: 3–30 m (9.8–98.4 ft); Detonated over open ocean at 4.833°N 149.417°W, 930 kilometres (580 mi) north-east of Kiritimati Island	N/A + 2,530 m (8,300 ft)	high alt rocket (30–80 km), weapons development	W47Y1 with Robin primary, Mk-1 RV	600 kt			Only US operational ballistic missile launch w/live warhead, Polaris A2 SLBM launched from USS Ethan Allen, successfully detonated 2,200 yd (2,000 m) from target.
Yukon	May 8, 1962 18:01:??	LINT (−10.67 hrs) (−10 hrs, 40 min)	Kiritimati (Christmas Island), Kiribati 1.62°N 157.32°W	0 + 878 m (2,881 ft)	parachuted, weapons development	Calliope II with Kinglet primary	100 kt			1st test of high fusion/low fission family; similar to Muskegon, Chetco, Nougat Arikaree, Hudson, Codsaw, Hoosic; yield slightly higher than expected.
Mesilla	May 9, 1962 17:01:??	LINT (−10.67 hrs) (−10 hrs, 40 min)	Kiritimati (Christmas Island), Kiribati 1.58°N 157.3°W	0 + 747 m (2,451 ft)	free air drop, weapons development	Zippo I secondary	100 kt			Advanced primary and secondary concepts test, yield considerably lower than expected.
Muskegon	May 11, 1962 15:37:??	LINT (−10.67 hrs) (−10 hrs, 40 min)	Kiritimati (Christmas Island), Kiribati 1.59°N 157.32°W	0 + 913 m (2,995 ft)	parachuted, weapons development	Kinglet primary and possibly with Harp secondary	50 kt			Advanced lightweight low fission concept, similar to Chetco and Yukon, slightly lower than expected yield.
Swordfish	May 11, 1962 20:02:05.9	PST (−8 hrs)	Pacific Ocean off California 31.245°N 124.212°W	0 - 198 m (650 ft)	underwater, weapon effect	W44	less than 20 kt			Full scale RUR-5 ASROC ASW rocket proof test, similar to Nougat Chena, fired from USS Agerholm at target 4,348 yd (3,976 m) away.
Encino	May 12, 1962 17:03:??	LINT (−10.67 hrs) (−10 hrs, 40 min)	Kiritimati (Christmas Island), Kiribati 1.58°N 157.31°W	0 + 1,679 m (5,509 ft)	free air drop, weapons development	XW-43Y5	500 kt			Verification of reduced yield variant of HT-I Elder shot.
Swanee	May 14, 1962 15:22:??	LINT (−10.67 hrs) (−10 hrs, 40 min)	Kiritimati (Christmas Island), Kiribati 1.57°N 157.32°W	0 + 896 m (2,940 ft)	parachuted, weapons development	Clean W56 device, possibly a XW-65 progenitor	97 kt			"Clean" ABM warhead test, similar to Bluestone, possible W-65 progenitor, highly experimental, yield lower than expected.
Chetco	May 19, 1962 15:37:??	LINT (−10.67 hrs) (−10 hrs, 40 min)	Kiritimati (Christmas Island), Kiribati 1.6°N 157.33°W	0 + 2,105 m (6,906 ft)	parachuted, weapons development	Kiglet primary with Calliope I secondary	73 kt			Advanced light weight concept, similar to Muskegon and Yukon, yield close to predicted, only 200 ft (61 m) from target.
Tanana	May 25, 1962 16:09:??	LINT (−10.67 hrs) (−10 hrs, 40 min)	Kiritimati (Christmas Island), Kiribati 1.6°N 157.3°W	0 + 2,752 m (9,029 ft)	parachuted, weapons development	Kinglet primary with Calliope III secondary	2.6 kt			Fizzle with secondary fail, "radical" design.
Nambe	May 27, 1962 17:03:??	LINT (−10.67 hrs) (−10 hrs, 40 min)	Kiritimati (Christmas Island), Kiribati 1.59°N 157.32°W	0 + 2,176 m (7,139 ft)	free air drop, weapons development	Scarab primary with Zippo II secondary	43 kt			"Unique" design, advanced concepts test, yield lower than expected.
Alma	June 8, 1962 17:03:??	LINT (−10.67 hrs) (−10 hrs, 40 min)	Kiritimati (Christmas Island), Kiribati 1.52°N 157.21°W	0 + 2,702 m (8,865 ft)	free air drop, weapons development	XW-59	782 kt			Similar to Questa, Rinconada, Sunset. 3.12 kt/kg.
Truckee	June 9, 1962 15:37:??	LINT (−10.67 hrs) (−10 hrs, 40 min)	Kiritimati (Christmas Island), Kiribati 1.58°N 157.3°W	0 + 2,125 m (6,972 ft)	parachuted, weapons development	XW-58 (Kinglet primary with Tuba secondary)	210 kt			Development and verification test for the Polaris A-3 weapon (3 MRV), satisfactory.
Yeso	June 10, 1962 17:01:??	LINT (−10.67 hrs) (−10 hrs, 40 min)	Kiritimati (Christmas Island), Kiribati 1.5°N 157.24°W	0 + 2,537 m (8,323 ft)	free air drop, weapons development	16-M device using Tsetse primary	3 Mt			Advanced concepts test, similar to HT-I Koa, performed as expected.
Harlem	June 12, 1962 15:37:??	LINT (−10.67 hrs) (−10 hrs, 40 min)	Kiritimati (Christmas Island), Kiribati 1.57°N 157.22°W	0 + 4,160 m (13,650 ft)	parachuted, weapons development	W-47Y2 Robin primary with Fife secondary	1.2 Mt			Successful, doubled W-47Y1 yield, 3.42 kt/kg.
Rinconada	June 15, 1962 16:01:??	LINT (−10.67 hrs) (−10 hrs, 40 min)	Kiritimati (Christmas Island), Kiribati 1.56°N 157.23°W	0 + 2,775 m (9,104 ft)	free air drop, weapons development	XW-59 "Wall" device	800 kt			Increased yield warhead test, successful, similar to Questa, Alma, Sunset. 3.48 kt/kg.
Dulce	June 17, 1962 16:01:??	LINT (−10.67 hrs) (−10 hrs, 40 min)	Kiritimati (Christmas Island), Kiribati 1.59°N 157.28°W	0 + 2,771 m (9,091 ft)	free air drop, weapons development	Zippo secondary	52 kt			Experimental lightweight, high efficiency design, similar to Mesilla, basic design adequacy confirmed.
Petit	June 19, 1962 15:01:??	LINT (−10.67 hrs) (−10 hrs, 40 min)	Kiritimati (Christmas Island), Kiribati 1.57°N 157.28°W	0 + 4,570 m (14,990 ft)	parachuted, weapons development	Kinglet primary with Oboe secondary	2.2 kt			Advanced concepts test, second LRL fizzle, no secondary.
Otowi	June 22, 1962 16:01:??	LINT (−10.67 hrs) (−10 hrs, 40 min)	Kiritimati (Christmas Island), Kiribati 1.58°N 157.31°W	0 + 2,746 m (9,009 ft)	air drop, weapons development	Zuppy primary with Zippo III secondary	81.5 kt			Advanced concepts test of "novel system".
Bighorn	June 27, 1962 15:19:??	LINT (−10.67 hrs) (−10 hrs, 40 min)	Kiritimati (Christmas Island), Kiribati 1.37°N 157.24°W	0 + 3,600 m (11,800 ft)	air drop, weapons development	Swan primary with Cello I-C secondary	7.7 Mt			Advanced concepts test, successful. 4.14 kt/kg.
Bluestone	June 30, 1962 15:21:??	LINT (−10.67 hrs) (−10 hrs, 40 min)	Kiritimati (Christmas Island), Kiribati 1.53°N 157.25°W	0 + 1,518 m (4,980 ft)	parachuted, weapons development	XW-56-X2 prime device	1.27 Mt			Similar to Swanee; 4.96 kt/kg.
Sunset	July 10, 1962 16:33:??	LINT (−10.67 hrs) (−10 hrs, 40 min)	Kiritimati (Christmas Island), Kiribati 1.6°N 157.26°W	0 + 1,500 m (4,900 ft)	air drop, weapons development	XW-59	1 Mt			High yield advanced concepts test, similar to Questa, Alma, Rinconada, 4.06 kt/kg.
Pamlico	July 11, 1962 15:37:??	LINT (−10.67 hrs) (−10 hrs, 40 min)	Kiritimati (Christmas Island), Kiribati 1.39°N 157.22°W	0 + 4,370 m (14,340 ft)	parachuted, weapons development	Kinglet primary with Ripple I secondary	3.9 Mt			Advanced principles test for high-efficiency fusion burn, successful, last Christmas Island airdrop; 0.934 kt/kg (experimental drops are low usually).
Androscoggin	October 2, 1962 16:18:??	jamt (−11 hrs); Believed in use during Dominic, Fishbowl, HT I.	Johnston Island, Johnston Atoll 13.8°N 172.1°W	0 + 3,130 m (10,270 ft)	air drop, weapons development	Kinglet primary with Ripple II secondary	75 kt			Ripple II secondary, fizzle, retested in Housatonic shot.
Bumping	October 6, 1962 16:03:??	jamt (−11 hrs); Believed in use during Dominic, Fishbowl, HT I.	Johnston Island, Johnston Atoll 14.6°N 168.3°W	0 + 3,050 m (10,010 ft)	air drop, weapons development	Kinglet primary with Oboe secondary	11.3 kt			Retest of Petit, yield much lower than expected, test to improve yield-to-weight ratio.
Chama	October 18, 1962 16:01:??	jamt (−11 hrs); Believed in use during Dominic, Fishbowl, HT I.	Johnston Island, Johnston Atoll 14.6°N 168.7°W	0 + 3,650 m (11,980 ft)	parachuted, weapons development	Croton primary with either Thumbelina or Zuppy secondary	1.6 Mt			Test of lightweight small diameter device, possible replacement for W-38, yield below predicted value.
Calamity	October 27, 1962 15:46:??	jamt (−11 hrs); Believed in use during Dominic, Fishbowl, HT I.	Johnston Island, Johnston Atoll 14.6°N 168.4°W	0 + 3,590 m (11,780 ft)	air drop, weapons development	Kinglet primary with Ripple III secondary	800 kt			Third drop test of specific device to maximize yield to weight ratio.
Housatonic	October 30, 1962 16:02:??	jamt (−11 hrs); Believed in use during Dominic, Fishbowl, HT I.	Johnston Island, Johnston Atoll 13.7°N 172.2°W	0 + 3,700 m (12,100 ft)	air drop, weapons development	Kinglet primary with Ripple II secondary	9.96 Mt			Repeat of Androscoggin, successful, target accuracy within 100 ft (30 m); last U.S. nuclear weapon airdrop. Reportedly 99.9% clean.

== Gallery ==
Dominic-Housatonic, 9.96 megatons

Dominic-Housatonic

Dominic-Muskegon, 50 kilotons

Dominic-Sunset, 1 megaton

Dominic-Yukon, 100 kilotons

Dominic-Arkansas, 1.1 megatons

Dominic-Chama, 1.6 megatons

Dominic-Swordfish, <20 kilotons

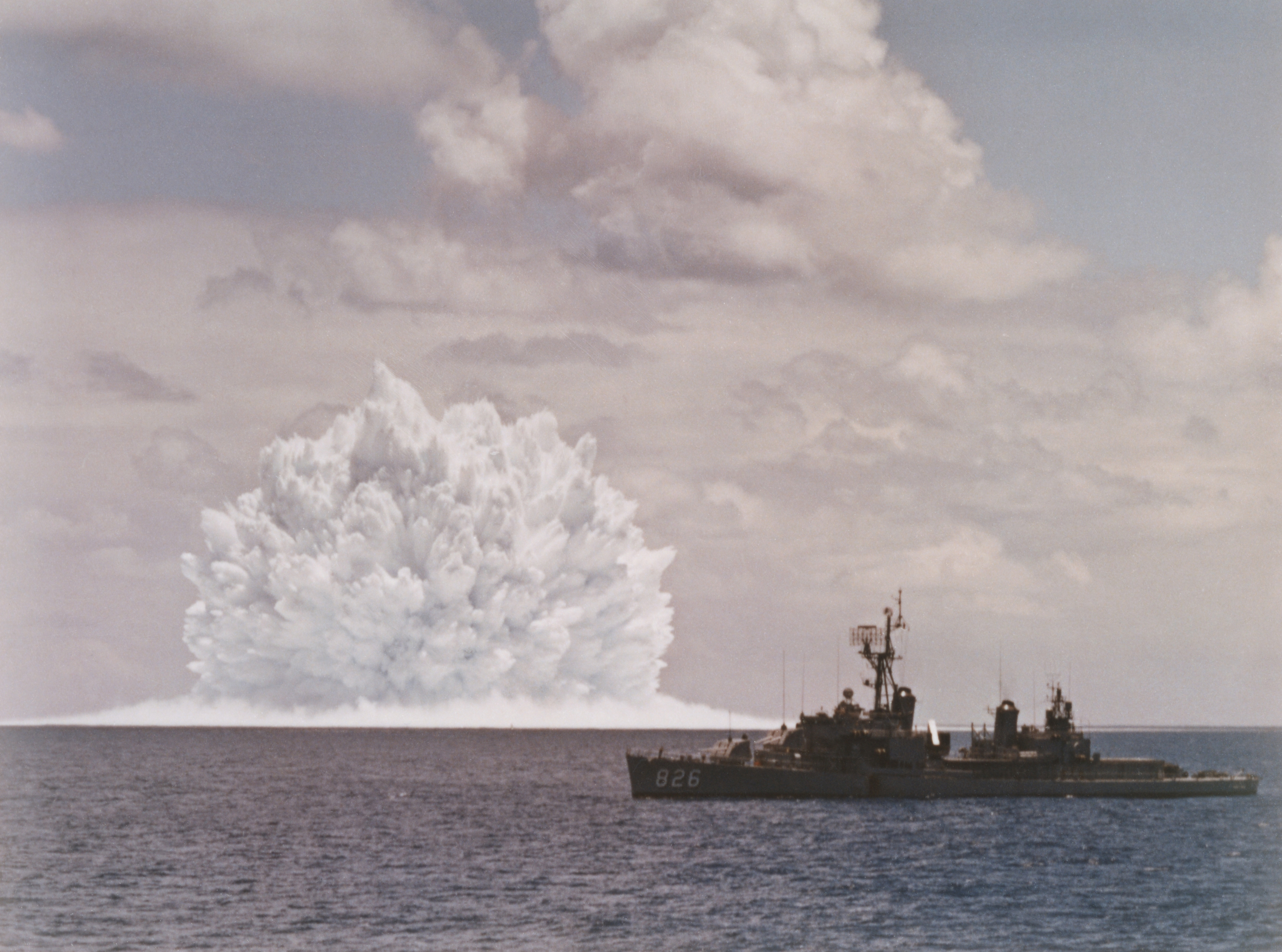
Swordfish spray dome and plume with USS Agerholm in foreground. Full scale test of ASROC rocket launched depth charge

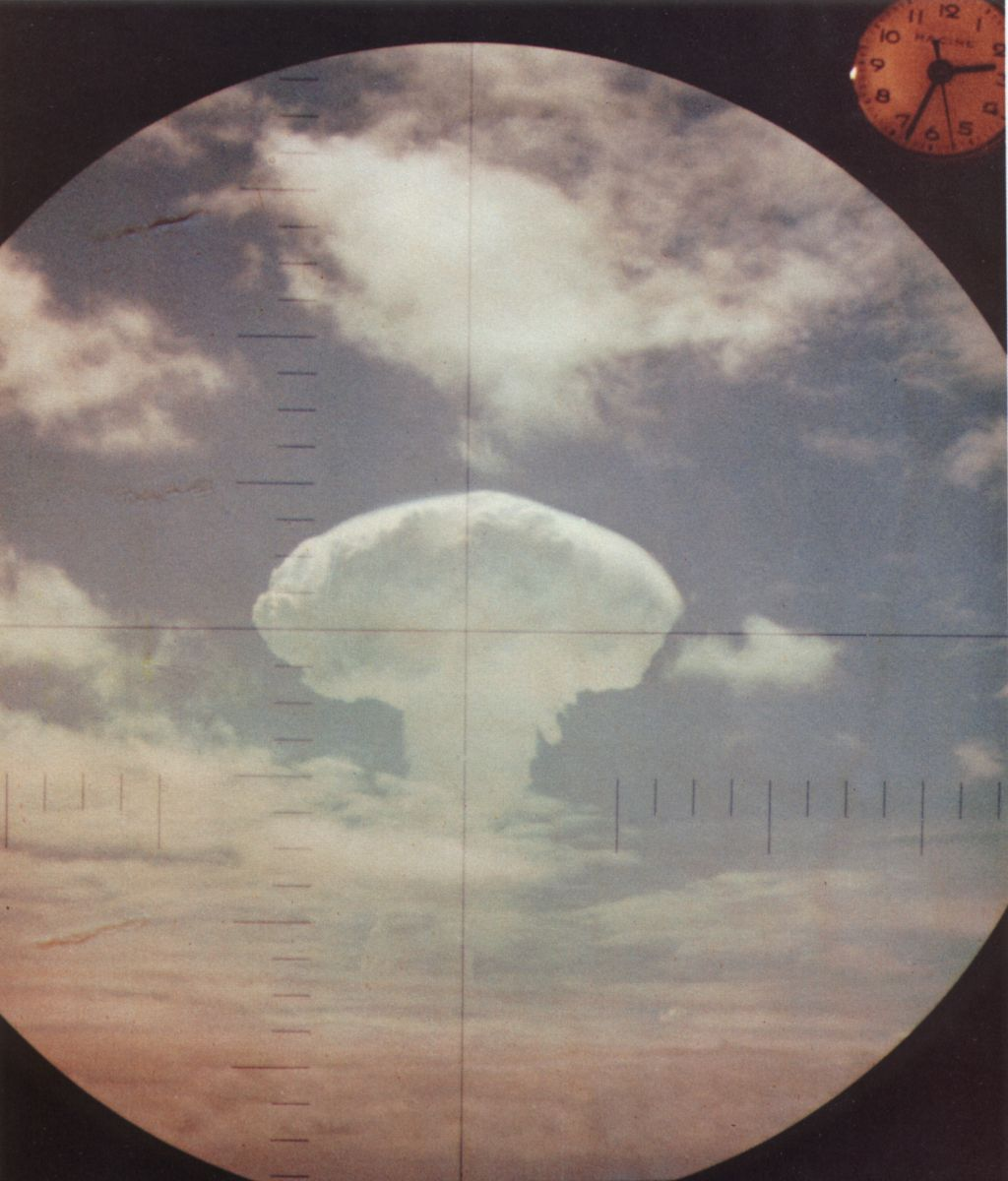
Dominic-Frigate Bird, as viewed from the submarine USS Carbonero

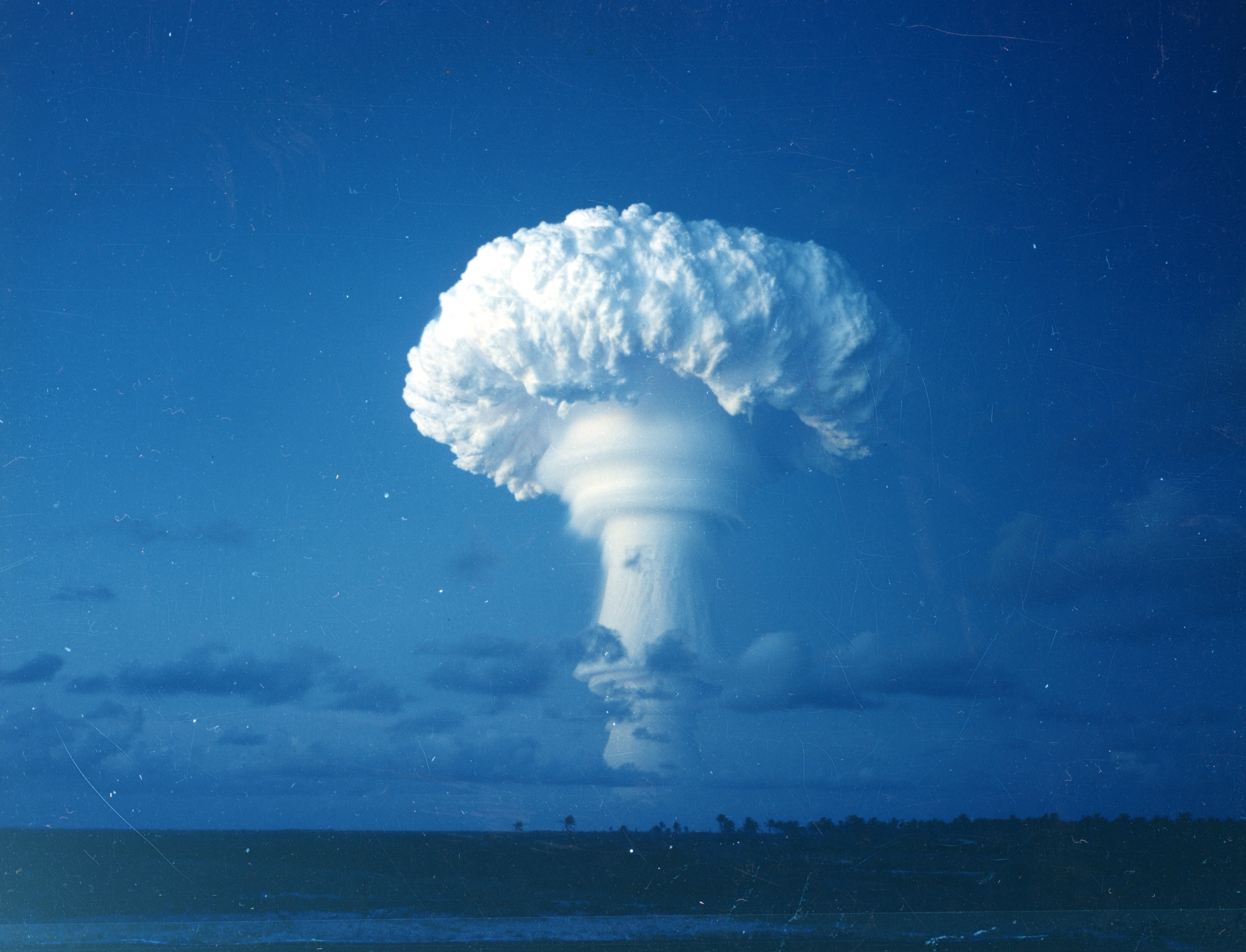
Dominic-Truckee, 210 kilotons

== See also ==
- List of United States nuclear weapons tests
