= Shock factor =

Figure of merit

Shock factor is a commonly used figure of merit for estimating the amount of shock experienced by a naval target from an underwater explosion as a function of explosive charge weight, slant range, and depression angle (between vessel and charge).

== Equation ==
Figure 1: Shock Factor Application Scenario.

$SF = {\frac{\sqrt W}{R}} {{(1+\sin \phi)} \over 2}$

- R is the slant range in feet
- W is the equivalent TNT charge weight in pounds = charge weight (lbs) · Relative effectiveness factor
- $\phi$ is the depression angle between the hull and warhead.

The application scenario for the equation is illustrated by Figure 1.

The numeric result from computing the shock factor has no physical meaning, but it does provide a value that can be used to estimate the effect of an underwater blast on a vessel. Table 1 describes the effect of an explosion on a vessel for a range of shock factors.

Table 1: Shock Factor Table of Effects
| Shock Factor | Damage |
|---|---|
| < 0.1 | Very limited damage. Generally considered insignificant |
| 0.1–0.15 | Lighting failures; electrical failures; some pipe leaks; pipe ruptures possible |
| 0.15–0.20 | Increase in occurrence of damage above; pipe rupture likely; machinery failures |
| 0.2 | General machinery damage |
| ≥ 0.5 | Usually considered lethal to a ship |

== Background ==
The idea behind the shock factor is that an explosion close to a ship generates a shock wave that can impart sudden vertical motions to a ship's hull and internal systems. Many of the internal mechanical systems (e.g. engine coupling to prop) require precise alignment in order to operate. These vibrations upset these critical alignments and render these systems inoperative. The vibrations can also destroy lighting and electrical components, such as relays.

The explosion also generates a gas bubble that undergoes expansion and contraction cycles. These cycles can introduce violent vibrations into a hull, generating structural damage, even to the point of breaking the ship's keel. In fact, this is a goal of many undersea weapon systems. The magnitude of an explosion's effects have been shown through empirical and theoretical analyses to be related to the size of the explosive charge, the distance of the charge from the target, and the angular relationship of the hull to the shock wave.
