= USS Agerholm =

Gearing-class destroyer

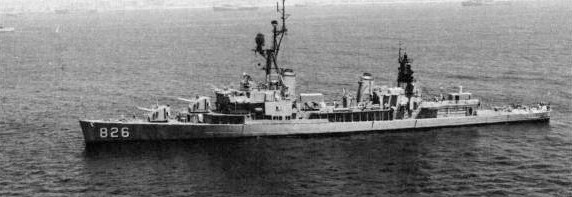
- USS Agerholm (DD-826)

History

United States
- Name: USS Agerholm
- Namesake: Harold C. Agerholm
- Laid down: 10 September 1945
- Launched: 30 March 1946
- Commissioned: 20 June 1946
- Decommissioned: 1 December 1978
- Stricken: 1 December 1978
- Identification: Callsign: NAYU; Hull number: DD-826
- Fate: Sunk as a target on 18 July 1982

General characteristics
- Class & type: Gearing-class destroyer
- Displacement: 2,425 tons full load
- Length: 390.5 ft (119.0 m)
- Beam: 41.1 ft (12.5 m)
- Draft: 18.5 ft (5.6 m)
- Speed: 35 kn (65 km/h; 40 mph)
- Complement: 367
- Armament: 6 x 5 in (130 mm) guns; 4 x 40 mm guns; 5 x 21 inch (533 mm) torpedo tubes; 6 depth charge projectors; 2 depth charge racks

USS Agerholm (DD-826) was a Gearing-class destroyer of the United States Navy. She was the only ship named for Harold Crist Agerholm (29 January 1925 – 7 July 1944), a Private First Class (Pfc.) in the 2nd Marine Division of the United States Marine Corps. He was killed during the assault on Saipan, and posthumously awarded the Medal of Honor.

== Construction and career ==
Agerholm was laid down on 10 September 1945 at Bath, Maine, by the Bath Iron Works, launched on 30 March 1946, sponsored by Mrs. Rose Agerholm, mother of Pfc. Agerholm; commissioned on 20 June 1946.

After commissioning and fitting out, the destroyer conducted shakedown training at Guantanamo Bay Naval Base, Cuba, and underwent post- shakedown repairs at the Boston Naval Shipyard before receiving orders to duty with the Pacific Fleet. Proceeding to the Pacific by way of the Panama Canal, she reached her new home port of San Diego on 21 January 1947.

=== First operations ===
Agerholm was assigned to Destroyer Division (DesDiv) 12 and settled into a routine of local training operations in the waters off southern California. On 10 March, the warship sailed from San Diego on her first extended cruise to the western Pacific. While operating with the 7th Fleet, Agerholm visited the Chinese ports of Tsingtao, Shanghai, and Amoy, before they were closed to American traffic. She also visited Kwajalein, Okinawa, Hong Kong, and several ports in Japan. The destroyer returned to San Diego on 26 November and remained there for the holiday season.

Between January 1948 and June 1950, Agerholm alternated two WestPac deployments with operations out of San Diego. Upon her return to San Diego in June 1950, she commenced overhaul at Mare Island, California, while other ships steamed to Korea as part of the United Nations task force defending South Korea from the aggression of her northern counterpart. Completing her overhaul in late 1950, Agerholm trained for war and set a course for the Far East. She entered the combat zone on 19 February 1951 and was assigned to Task Force 77 as screening ship and plane guard. The destroyer also aided in shore bombardment, training her guns on Wonsan on 28 April and 1 to 4 May, and on Kojo on 29 April. Agerholm returned to San Diego on 20 September for upkeep and local operations.

In May 1952, the warship left San Diego for her second tour with TF 77 in Korea. In addition to screening and planeguard duties, Agerholm conducted naval gunfire support as required. During one exchange of gunfire with a communist shore battery a single enemy shell struck the destroyer in the after part of the ship, starting a small fire in the crew's after berthing compartment but causing only minor damage to the weatherdeck. Agerholm continued on assigned duties until December, when she set a course for San Diego, arriving there on 21 December.

On 2 February 1953, the destroyer commenced another overhaul at Mare Island, followed by refresher training in May. After several months of preparation and fulfilling local training commitments, Agerholm got underway on 8 September for her sixth WestPac cruise. Although the Korean War had ended the 7th Fleet conducted various operations to ensure the continuation of peace in the Far East. Agerholm steamed many miles in support of the Formosa patrol, designed to deter both the Chinese Nationalists and the Chinese communists from invading each other, before she returned to her home port on 16 April.

=== Further operations ===
The destroyer made her seventh WestPac cruise from November 1954 to April 1955. While operating with TF 77, she again found herself involved in peacekeeping operations. Task Force 77 covered the evacuation of the Chinese Nationalist forces from the Tachen Islands in Operation Pullback. Following this mission the destroyer returned to the United States and commenced an overhaul at Mare Island on 29 April.

During the next five years, Agerholm deployed to the western Pacific four more times, and briefly stopped in Australia during the summer of 1958 to participate in ceremonies commemorating the Battle of the Coral Sea. In May 1960, the destroyer reported to Mare Island for extensive modification and changes under the Fleet Rehabilitation and Modernization (FRAM) program. Agerholm left the shipyard in March 1961 equipped with the latest antisubmarine rockets (ASROC), torpedoes, helicopter facilities, radar and sonar. During 1961, the destroyer devised and tested new techniques and tactics for use of her new capabilities.

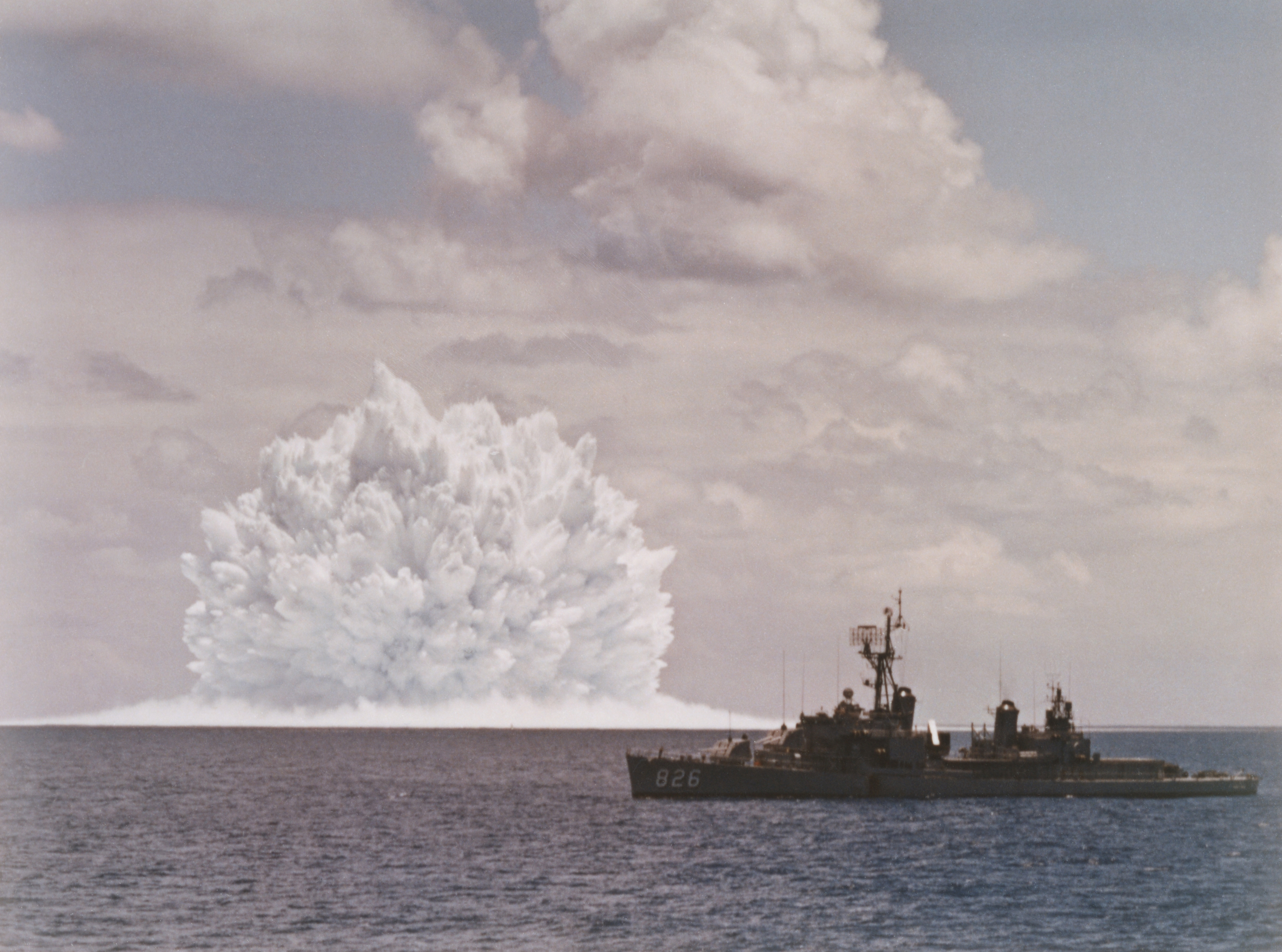
Agerholm tests an ASROC anti-submarine rocket armed with a nuclear depth bomb in 1962

On 11 May 1962, Agerholm participated in nuclear weapon testing in the Pacific in the "Swordfish" test, part of Operation Dominic. During this exercise the destroyer became the first surface ship to fire an antisubmarine nuclear weapon; the nuclear explosion occurring only about 4,000 yards from the ship. The submarine Razorback participated in the test, at the same distance as Agerholm.

In November, following continued training in the San Diego area, Agerholm sailed to the western Pacific on her 12th deployment. She returned to her home port in June 1963 and commenced overhaul at the Naval Repair Facility, San Diego, to update and improve the electronic and weapons systems on board. Following completion of the overhaul in January 1964, Agerholm continued her routine of local operations and preparations for deployment.

=== Vietnam ===
In August, the destroyer got underway for the western Pacific where she spent six months patrolling off the coast of Vietnam and in the Taiwan Strait. Upon her return to her home port early in 1965, Agerholm underwent a brief overhaul and in August embarked midshipmen for a cruise to Hawaii. With the escalation of American involvement in Vietnam, the destroyer prepared for another cruise to that area.

Agerholm began her next deployment in January 1966 when she departed San Diego for Vietnam. There, her assigned duties included Naval Gunfire Support (NGFS), anti-submarine warfare (ASW), carrier escort, and search and rescue (SAR). In May during NGFS off the South Vietnamese coast, Agerholm provided call fire for a Marine Corps air spotter who was drawing heavy gunfire. The destroyer silenced the Viet Cong machine gun nest with just four rounds from her 5 in (130 mm) guns. On 17 June Agerholm aided a South Vietnamese patrol boat and took off 12 badly wounded men while on a SAR mission in the Gulf of Tonkin. The ship visited Subic Bay, Yokosuka, Kaohsiung, Hong Kong and Pearl Harbor before returning to San Diego in July. While in Yokosuka, Angerholm was filmed and subsequently made a cameo appearance in the 1968 movie Nobody's Perfect.

Agerholm began another modernization overhaul at the Long Beach Naval Shipyard in August. She received new 5-inch gun mounts, and advanced radar and sonar gear, as well as communications systems and engineering plant alterations. The destroyer left the shipyard in December to spend the holiday season in her home port.

With the advent of 1967, Agerholm once again prepared for deployment to the Far East. On 15 May, she departed for the Gulf of Tonkin, joining the aircraft carrier USS Intrepid at Subic Bay. The ships sailed to "Yankee Station" where they arrived on 20 June. For the next four months, Agerholm provided plane guard assistance for the carriers Intrepid, Constellation, and Coral Sea.

When a major fire broke out on the aircraft carrier Forrestal on 29 July all ships in the area, including Agerholm, aided in the rescue operations and stood by until the damaged carrier was able to steam under her own power for Subic Bay. The destroyer departed "Yankee Station" on 1 October and arrived in San Diego on 25 October.

Agerholm spent most of 1968 on training cruises for United States Naval Academy and ROTC midshipmen. In May, she participated in tests conducted off San Clemente Island by the China Lake Naval Weapons Testing Center, and fired the new rocket-assisted projectile (RAP). Two days before the year was out, Agerholm sailed from San Diego on her 16th WestPac cruise. During the transit to the Gulf of Tonkin via Pearl Harbor and Subic Bay, the destroyer escorted the aircraft carrier Kitty Hawk, and subsequently served as plane guard for that carrier's first combat launch from "Yankee Station" during the new year 1969.

From 28 January to 10 February, Agerholm served as escort for the destroyer leader William H. Standley in the positive identification radar advisory zone (PIRAZ). She then proceeded to the Southern SAR station to ride shotgun for the destroyer leader Fox. The destroyer shifted to the gunline on 23 March, and provided naval gunfire support to troops in the Viet Cong-dominated Rung Sat Special Zone (RSSZ). Anchored in the shallow restricted water with the Viet Cong less than 6,000 yards (5.5 km) away, Agerholm was vulnerable to enemy fire, underwater swimmers, and mines. On 25 March, the destroyer first fired both RAP and conventional ammunition into the RSSZ with great accuracy. On 13 April, she retired from NGFS to visit Singapore, Hong Kong, and Kaohsiang. Agerholm returned to the gunline on 15 May, conducting shore bombardments off Phan Thiet until 23 May. She then reported to the cruiser Chicago on PIRAZ station in the Gulf of Tonkin for her last assignment. On 10 June, the warship was relieved and ordered to Subic Bay to prepare for her return voyage. After port visits to Brisbane, Australia, and Auckland, New Zealand Agerholm set a course for San Diego, where she arrived on 24 July.

=== Further cruises ===
The destroyer entered Hunters Point Naval Shipyard on 11 September for overhaul, which was completed on 19 December. Agerholm returned to San Diego the next day for the Christmas holidays. Agerholm got underway on 26 January 1970 for type training, followed by eight weeks of refresher training. On 15 April, the destroyer completed the exhausting round of drills and commenced preparations for overseas deployment.

Agerholm departed San Diego on 6 July and steamed via Pearl Harbor, Midway, and Guam, to Subic Bay, arriving on 28 July. From there, the destroyer served on the gunline, on the northern SAR station, as PIRAZ escort, and as plane guard. On 14 October, Agerholm was detached for independent transit to Hong Kong. En route, the destroyer passed within 60 miles (97 km) of the center of Super Typhoon Joan in the South China Sea. For two tense days, the crew was uncertain of surviving the 60 knots (110 km/h; 69 mph) winds and 40-foot (12 m) seas, but the destroyer began to open the typhoon center late on 16 October. The remainder of her deployment was spent at PIRAZ station until 4 December when Agerholm cleared the area for Guam, Midway, and Pearl Harbor. The ship arrived back in San Diego on 20 December and spent the remainder of the year in her home port.

Agerholm spent the first six months of 1971 in port at San Diego or operating off the California coast. On 29 June, the destroyer began another WestPac cruise, taking up gunline duties near Binh Thuy, South Vietnam, on 6 August. In addition to NGFS, Agerholm served as planeguard and SAR ship before departing the area on 4 December. She returned to San Diego for the holidays, and closed out the year with post-deployment standdown.

Local exercises and inspections occupied Agerholm until 24 July 1972 when she entered the Long Beach Naval Shipyard for a five-month overhaul. The destroyer departed the shipyard on 21 December and steamed to San Diego, where she began preparations, both at sea and in port, for refresher training on 7 February 1973. After seven weeks of continuous drills, Agerholm successfully completed refresher training and qualified in NGFS at San Clemente Island.

On 7 February 1973, three sailors were injured in an engine room fire aboard Agerholm while off San Diego.

On 26 April, Agerholm set sail in company with the destroyer escort Stein for the western Pacific. She arrived off the coast of Vietnam at "Yankee Station" on 28 May to serve as plane guard for Constellation. The destroyer then underwent a two-week availability alongside the auxiliary vessel Ajax in Sasebo, Japan commencing 8 June. Upon completion of those repairs, she put to sea for radar picket duty in the Gulf of Tonkin. Another two weeks at "Yankee Station" followed by two weeks on PIRAZ station brought her Vietnam service to an end. On 30 August, Agerholm departed the Gulf of Tonkin en route to MacKay, Australia, for liberty.

After that port visit, the destroyer sailed to Auckland, New Zealand to join the other ships participating in Operation Longex 73, a joint surface, air, and submarine warfare exercise. From 25 September to 3 October Agerholm drilled in ASW and anti-aircraft warfare (AAW) exercises – including night surface attacks on the task groups. Upon completion of the drill, she steamed to Sydney, Australia; Suva, Fiji; and Pearl Harbor, before arriving back in San Diego on 1 November.

Upon arrival, Agerholm commenced a post-deployment readiness improvement program of schools, on board training, and a repair availability. On 25 February 1974, the warship got underway for readiness exercises in the southern California area until 17 September, when she departed San Diego on her 20th WestPac cruise. Remaining primarily in the Subic Bay operating area, Agerholm participated in gunnery, ASW, AAW, and ship handling drills until 13 December, when she shaped a course for Apra Harbor, Guam. She ended the year at the ship repair facility there. The destroyer visited Hong Kong and Singapore for liberty, but received orders on 8 February 1975 to join Operation Eagle Pull, the evacuation of the American embassy in Phnom Penh, Cambodia. Agerhoim completed her role in the evacuation on 26 February, and she began the long voyage home.

Agerholm arrived in San Diego on 8 April and spent the rest of 1975 and 1976 on the west coast participating in local operations and midshipman training cruises, and eventually landing a role in the movie Airport '77. The year 1977 began the same way with only a drydock period at Todd Pacific Shipyards in San Pedro from May to July to interrupt the routine. On 6 September, the destroyer made her 21st and last WestPac cruise. Agerholm conducted NGFS training, ASROC test firings, and participated in Exercise Fortress Lightning, a full-scale amphibious landing on Mindoro Island in the Philippines. She stopped for liberty calls at Suva, Auckland, Whangārei, and Nelson, New Zealand, Newcastle and Devonport, Australia, before returning: to San Diego early in 1978 to resume a local operation schedule.

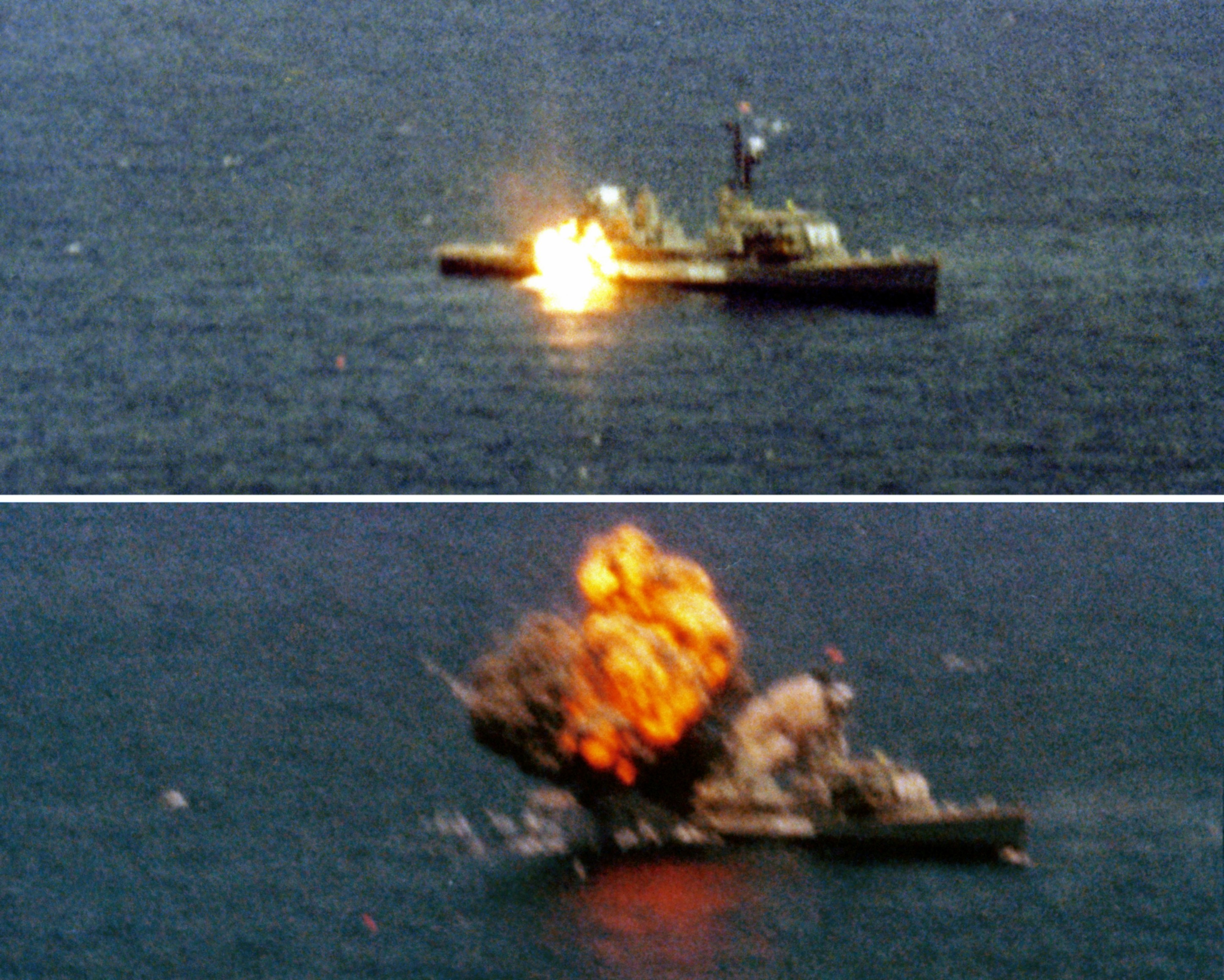
Agerholm being sunk by an UGM-109 launched from USS Guitarro, 1982.

=== Disposal ===
From 10 to 13 October 1978, the Board of Inspection and Survey conducted a survey of Agerholm to determine her material condition and the feasibility of keeping her in active service. The board found that her age and lack of modern capabilities could not be corrected economically. Agerholm was decommissioned on 1 December 1978, and her name was struck from the Navy List on the same day. She was sunk as a target on 18 July 1982 by a Tomahawk cruise missile fired by the submarine USS Guitarro (SSN-665). The wreck lies in 400 fathoms (2,400 ft; 732 m) of water at approximately 32°45′N 119°32′W.

== Honors and awards ==
- Korean Service Medal with four battle stars
- Vietnam Service Medal with eight battle stars

Agerholm earned four battle stars for Korean War service and eight for Vietnam War tours.
